

603001–603100 

|-bgcolor=#C2FFFF
| 603001 ||  || — || April 25, 2008 || Kitt Peak || Spacewatch || L5 || align=right | 8.4 km || 
|-id=002 bgcolor=#d6d6d6
| 603002 ||  || — || September 17, 2014 || Haleakala || Pan-STARRS ||  || align=right | 2.5 km || 
|-id=003 bgcolor=#E9E9E9
| 603003 ||  || — || October 25, 2014 || Haleakala || Pan-STARRS ||  || align=right | 1.3 km || 
|-id=004 bgcolor=#E9E9E9
| 603004 ||  || — || October 30, 2014 || Mount Lemmon || Mount Lemmon Survey ||  || align=right | 1.2 km || 
|-id=005 bgcolor=#fefefe
| 603005 ||  || — || January 19, 2012 || Kitt Peak || Spacewatch ||  || align=right data-sort-value="0.46" | 460 m || 
|-id=006 bgcolor=#fefefe
| 603006 ||  || — || October 25, 2014 || Haleakala || Pan-STARRS ||  || align=right data-sort-value="0.67" | 670 m || 
|-id=007 bgcolor=#E9E9E9
| 603007 ||  || — || October 28, 2014 || Haleakala || Pan-STARRS ||  || align=right | 1.3 km || 
|-id=008 bgcolor=#d6d6d6
| 603008 ||  || — || October 29, 2014 || Kitt Peak || Spacewatch ||  || align=right | 1.5 km || 
|-id=009 bgcolor=#d6d6d6
| 603009 ||  || — || September 18, 2003 || Palomar || NEAT ||  || align=right | 2.9 km || 
|-id=010 bgcolor=#d6d6d6
| 603010 ||  || — || October 25, 2014 || Kitt Peak || Spacewatch ||  || align=right | 1.7 km || 
|-id=011 bgcolor=#d6d6d6
| 603011 ||  || — || September 20, 2014 || Haleakala || Pan-STARRS ||  || align=right | 2.4 km || 
|-id=012 bgcolor=#fefefe
| 603012 ||  || — || October 18, 2014 || Mount Lemmon || Mount Lemmon Survey ||  || align=right data-sort-value="0.67" | 670 m || 
|-id=013 bgcolor=#E9E9E9
| 603013 ||  || — || November 14, 2014 || Kitt Peak || Spacewatch ||  || align=right data-sort-value="0.69" | 690 m || 
|-id=014 bgcolor=#fefefe
| 603014 ||  || — || March 17, 2005 || Kitt Peak || Spacewatch ||  || align=right data-sort-value="0.63" | 630 m || 
|-id=015 bgcolor=#fefefe
| 603015 ||  || — || October 17, 2001 || Kitt Peak || Spacewatch ||  || align=right data-sort-value="0.54" | 540 m || 
|-id=016 bgcolor=#E9E9E9
| 603016 ||  || — || October 16, 2001 || Palomar || NEAT ||  || align=right | 1.2 km || 
|-id=017 bgcolor=#fefefe
| 603017 ||  || — || November 4, 2014 || Mount Lemmon || Mount Lemmon Survey ||  || align=right data-sort-value="0.65" | 650 m || 
|-id=018 bgcolor=#fefefe
| 603018 ||  || — || October 18, 2003 || Palomar || NEAT ||  || align=right | 1.2 km || 
|-id=019 bgcolor=#fefefe
| 603019 ||  || — || March 24, 2006 || Kitt Peak || Spacewatch ||  || align=right data-sort-value="0.79" | 790 m || 
|-id=020 bgcolor=#fefefe
| 603020 ||  || — || March 12, 2005 || Kitt Peak || Spacewatch ||  || align=right data-sort-value="0.54" | 540 m || 
|-id=021 bgcolor=#fefefe
| 603021 ||  || — || December 31, 2011 || Piszkesteto || A. Szing ||  || align=right data-sort-value="0.87" | 870 m || 
|-id=022 bgcolor=#fefefe
| 603022 ||  || — || November 16, 2014 || Mount Lemmon || Mount Lemmon Survey ||  || align=right data-sort-value="0.54" | 540 m || 
|-id=023 bgcolor=#fefefe
| 603023 ||  || — || May 3, 2006 || Mount Lemmon || Mount Lemmon Survey ||  || align=right data-sort-value="0.67" | 670 m || 
|-id=024 bgcolor=#fefefe
| 603024 ||  || — || December 29, 2011 || Mount Lemmon || Mount Lemmon Survey ||  || align=right data-sort-value="0.85" | 850 m || 
|-id=025 bgcolor=#C2FFFF
| 603025 ||  || — || October 25, 2014 || Haleakala || Pan-STARRS || L5 || align=right | 8.1 km || 
|-id=026 bgcolor=#fefefe
| 603026 ||  || — || November 9, 2007 || Kitt Peak || Spacewatch ||  || align=right data-sort-value="0.56" | 560 m || 
|-id=027 bgcolor=#d6d6d6
| 603027 ||  || — || October 30, 2014 || Kitt Peak || Spacewatch ||  || align=right | 2.2 km || 
|-id=028 bgcolor=#fefefe
| 603028 ||  || — || November 2, 2007 || Mount Lemmon || Mount Lemmon Survey ||  || align=right data-sort-value="0.55" | 550 m || 
|-id=029 bgcolor=#E9E9E9
| 603029 ||  || — || August 19, 2001 || Cerro Tololo || Cerro Tololo Obs. ||  || align=right data-sort-value="0.75" | 750 m || 
|-id=030 bgcolor=#d6d6d6
| 603030 ||  || — || March 15, 2012 || Haleakala || Pan-STARRS || Tj (2.96) || align=right | 4.1 km || 
|-id=031 bgcolor=#fefefe
| 603031 ||  || — || March 19, 2009 || Kitt Peak || Spacewatch ||  || align=right data-sort-value="0.73" | 730 m || 
|-id=032 bgcolor=#d6d6d6
| 603032 ||  || — || November 17, 2014 || Mount Lemmon || Mount Lemmon Survey ||  || align=right | 2.3 km || 
|-id=033 bgcolor=#E9E9E9
| 603033 ||  || — || October 22, 2006 || Mount Lemmon || Mount Lemmon Survey ||  || align=right data-sort-value="0.79" | 790 m || 
|-id=034 bgcolor=#E9E9E9
| 603034 ||  || — || April 12, 2008 || Kitt Peak || Spacewatch ||  || align=right | 1.0 km || 
|-id=035 bgcolor=#fefefe
| 603035 ||  || — || October 25, 2014 || Haleakala || Pan-STARRS ||  || align=right data-sort-value="0.70" | 700 m || 
|-id=036 bgcolor=#E9E9E9
| 603036 ||  || — || September 7, 2004 || Kitt Peak || Spacewatch ||  || align=right | 1.7 km || 
|-id=037 bgcolor=#d6d6d6
| 603037 ||  || — || November 24, 2009 || Kitt Peak || Spacewatch || THM || align=right | 2.0 km || 
|-id=038 bgcolor=#d6d6d6
| 603038 ||  || — || March 26, 2006 || Mount Lemmon || Mount Lemmon Survey ||  || align=right | 3.1 km || 
|-id=039 bgcolor=#fefefe
| 603039 ||  || — || August 25, 2003 || Palomar || NEAT ||  || align=right data-sort-value="0.88" | 880 m || 
|-id=040 bgcolor=#d6d6d6
| 603040 ||  || — || August 1, 2013 || Haleakala || Pan-STARRS ||  || align=right | 3.1 km || 
|-id=041 bgcolor=#fefefe
| 603041 ||  || — || January 1, 2008 || Kitt Peak || Spacewatch ||  || align=right data-sort-value="0.53" | 530 m || 
|-id=042 bgcolor=#d6d6d6
| 603042 ||  || — || November 8, 2009 || Mount Lemmon || Mount Lemmon Survey ||  || align=right | 1.9 km || 
|-id=043 bgcolor=#E9E9E9
| 603043 ||  || — || April 7, 2013 || Mount Lemmon || Mount Lemmon Survey ||  || align=right | 1.5 km || 
|-id=044 bgcolor=#d6d6d6
| 603044 ||  || — || September 24, 2014 || Mount Lemmon || Mount Lemmon Survey || EMA || align=right | 2.6 km || 
|-id=045 bgcolor=#fefefe
| 603045 ||  || — || October 25, 2014 || Mount Lemmon || Mount Lemmon Survey ||  || align=right data-sort-value="0.64" | 640 m || 
|-id=046 bgcolor=#fefefe
| 603046 ||  || — || February 22, 2009 || Kitt Peak || Spacewatch ||  || align=right data-sort-value="0.66" | 660 m || 
|-id=047 bgcolor=#fefefe
| 603047 ||  || — || October 10, 2007 || Mount Lemmon || Mount Lemmon Survey ||  || align=right data-sort-value="0.71" | 710 m || 
|-id=048 bgcolor=#d6d6d6
| 603048 ||  || — || September 24, 2014 || Kitt Peak || Spacewatch || 7:4 || align=right | 3.0 km || 
|-id=049 bgcolor=#fefefe
| 603049 ||  || — || April 9, 2003 || Kitt Peak || Spacewatch ||  || align=right data-sort-value="0.75" | 750 m || 
|-id=050 bgcolor=#fefefe
| 603050 ||  || — || December 16, 2004 || Kitt Peak || Spacewatch ||  || align=right data-sort-value="0.72" | 720 m || 
|-id=051 bgcolor=#d6d6d6
| 603051 ||  || — || October 18, 2009 || La Sagra || OAM Obs. ||  || align=right | 3.4 km || 
|-id=052 bgcolor=#fefefe
| 603052 ||  || — || December 9, 2004 || Kitt Peak || Spacewatch ||  || align=right data-sort-value="0.64" | 640 m || 
|-id=053 bgcolor=#fefefe
| 603053 ||  || — || January 5, 2002 || Haleakala || AMOS ||  || align=right data-sort-value="0.98" | 980 m || 
|-id=054 bgcolor=#fefefe
| 603054 ||  || — || October 23, 2003 || Kitt Peak || Spacewatch || V || align=right data-sort-value="0.50" | 500 m || 
|-id=055 bgcolor=#d6d6d6
| 603055 ||  || — || September 21, 2009 || Mount Lemmon || Mount Lemmon Survey ||  || align=right | 3.2 km || 
|-id=056 bgcolor=#fefefe
| 603056 ||  || — || October 20, 2007 || Mount Lemmon || Mount Lemmon Survey ||  || align=right data-sort-value="0.64" | 640 m || 
|-id=057 bgcolor=#fefefe
| 603057 ||  || — || November 5, 2007 || Kitt Peak || Spacewatch ||  || align=right data-sort-value="0.54" | 540 m || 
|-id=058 bgcolor=#fefefe
| 603058 ||  || — || November 20, 2014 || Haleakala || Pan-STARRS ||  || align=right data-sort-value="0.63" | 630 m || 
|-id=059 bgcolor=#fefefe
| 603059 ||  || — || February 3, 2009 || Mount Lemmon || Mount Lemmon Survey ||  || align=right data-sort-value="0.63" | 630 m || 
|-id=060 bgcolor=#fefefe
| 603060 ||  || — || October 14, 2007 || Mount Lemmon || Mount Lemmon Survey ||  || align=right data-sort-value="0.65" | 650 m || 
|-id=061 bgcolor=#d6d6d6
| 603061 ||  || — || October 20, 2014 || Piszkesteto || K. Sárneczky ||  || align=right | 1.9 km || 
|-id=062 bgcolor=#E9E9E9
| 603062 ||  || — || March 31, 2008 || Mount Lemmon || Mount Lemmon Survey ||  || align=right data-sort-value="0.81" | 810 m || 
|-id=063 bgcolor=#d6d6d6
| 603063 ||  || — || November 18, 2014 || Haleakala || Pan-STARRS ||  || align=right | 3.1 km || 
|-id=064 bgcolor=#d6d6d6
| 603064 ||  || — || October 26, 2014 || Haleakala || Pan-STARRS || 7:4 || align=right | 2.9 km || 
|-id=065 bgcolor=#fefefe
| 603065 ||  || — || February 24, 2012 || Mount Lemmon || Mount Lemmon Survey ||  || align=right data-sort-value="0.56" | 560 m || 
|-id=066 bgcolor=#fefefe
| 603066 ||  || — || October 24, 2014 || Kitt Peak || Spacewatch ||  || align=right data-sort-value="0.49" | 490 m || 
|-id=067 bgcolor=#d6d6d6
| 603067 ||  || — || July 10, 2014 || Haleakala || Pan-STARRS ||  || align=right | 2.9 km || 
|-id=068 bgcolor=#fefefe
| 603068 ||  || — || November 21, 2014 || Haleakala || Pan-STARRS ||  || align=right data-sort-value="0.51" | 510 m || 
|-id=069 bgcolor=#E9E9E9
| 603069 ||  || — || October 1, 1995 || Kitt Peak || Spacewatch ||  || align=right | 1.5 km || 
|-id=070 bgcolor=#d6d6d6
| 603070 ||  || — || November 21, 2014 || Haleakala || Pan-STARRS || 7:4 || align=right | 2.3 km || 
|-id=071 bgcolor=#E9E9E9
| 603071 ||  || — || September 20, 2014 || Haleakala || Pan-STARRS ||  || align=right data-sort-value="0.82" | 820 m || 
|-id=072 bgcolor=#E9E9E9
| 603072 ||  || — || July 27, 2009 || Catalina || CSS ||  || align=right | 1.7 km || 
|-id=073 bgcolor=#fefefe
| 603073 ||  || — || October 30, 2014 || Mount Lemmon || Mount Lemmon Survey ||  || align=right data-sort-value="0.55" | 550 m || 
|-id=074 bgcolor=#d6d6d6
| 603074 ||  || — || August 23, 2014 || Haleakala || Pan-STARRS ||  || align=right | 2.0 km || 
|-id=075 bgcolor=#fefefe
| 603075 ||  || — || August 10, 2007 || Kitt Peak || Spacewatch ||  || align=right data-sort-value="0.64" | 640 m || 
|-id=076 bgcolor=#fefefe
| 603076 ||  || — || November 22, 2014 || Haleakala || Pan-STARRS ||  || align=right data-sort-value="0.59" | 590 m || 
|-id=077 bgcolor=#fefefe
| 603077 ||  || — || November 24, 2014 || Mount Lemmon || Mount Lemmon Survey ||  || align=right data-sort-value="0.78" | 780 m || 
|-id=078 bgcolor=#E9E9E9
| 603078 ||  || — || November 24, 2014 || Mount Lemmon || Mount Lemmon Survey ||  || align=right | 1.4 km || 
|-id=079 bgcolor=#fefefe
| 603079 ||  || — || October 14, 2004 || Palomar || NEAT ||  || align=right data-sort-value="0.92" | 920 m || 
|-id=080 bgcolor=#E9E9E9
| 603080 ||  || — || October 22, 2014 || Mount Lemmon || Mount Lemmon Survey ||  || align=right data-sort-value="0.93" | 930 m || 
|-id=081 bgcolor=#fefefe
| 603081 ||  || — || April 4, 2005 || Catalina || CSS ||  || align=right data-sort-value="0.90" | 900 m || 
|-id=082 bgcolor=#fefefe
| 603082 ||  || — || April 19, 2009 || Mount Lemmon || Mount Lemmon Survey ||  || align=right data-sort-value="0.68" | 680 m || 
|-id=083 bgcolor=#d6d6d6
| 603083 ||  || — || July 16, 2013 || Haleakala || Pan-STARRS ||  || align=right | 2.3 km || 
|-id=084 bgcolor=#fefefe
| 603084 ||  || — || November 17, 2014 || Haleakala || Pan-STARRS ||  || align=right data-sort-value="0.50" | 500 m || 
|-id=085 bgcolor=#fefefe
| 603085 ||  || — || November 3, 2010 || Mount Lemmon || Mount Lemmon Survey ||  || align=right data-sort-value="0.71" | 710 m || 
|-id=086 bgcolor=#d6d6d6
| 603086 ||  || — || October 6, 2008 || Kitt Peak || Spacewatch ||  || align=right | 1.7 km || 
|-id=087 bgcolor=#fefefe
| 603087 ||  || — || December 22, 2008 || Kitt Peak || Spacewatch ||  || align=right data-sort-value="0.52" | 520 m || 
|-id=088 bgcolor=#E9E9E9
| 603088 ||  || — || July 15, 2013 || Haleakala || Pan-STARRS ||  || align=right | 1.2 km || 
|-id=089 bgcolor=#E9E9E9
| 603089 ||  || — || November 22, 2014 || Haleakala || Pan-STARRS ||  || align=right | 1.3 km || 
|-id=090 bgcolor=#fefefe
| 603090 ||  || — || November 27, 2014 || Kitt Peak || Spacewatch ||  || align=right data-sort-value="0.51" | 510 m || 
|-id=091 bgcolor=#fefefe
| 603091 ||  || — || September 2, 2010 || Mount Lemmon || Mount Lemmon Survey ||  || align=right data-sort-value="0.60" | 600 m || 
|-id=092 bgcolor=#fefefe
| 603092 ||  || — || September 12, 2010 || Kitt Peak || Spacewatch ||  || align=right data-sort-value="0.73" | 730 m || 
|-id=093 bgcolor=#fefefe
| 603093 ||  || — || November 16, 1999 || Kitt Peak || Spacewatch ||  || align=right data-sort-value="0.69" | 690 m || 
|-id=094 bgcolor=#fefefe
| 603094 ||  || — || November 27, 2014 || Haleakala || Pan-STARRS ||  || align=right data-sort-value="0.72" | 720 m || 
|-id=095 bgcolor=#fefefe
| 603095 ||  || — || March 1, 2012 || Mount Lemmon || Mount Lemmon Survey ||  || align=right data-sort-value="0.64" | 640 m || 
|-id=096 bgcolor=#d6d6d6
| 603096 ||  || — || November 27, 2014 || Haleakala || Pan-STARRS ||  || align=right | 2.5 km || 
|-id=097 bgcolor=#fefefe
| 603097 ||  || — || May 26, 2006 || Mount Lemmon || Mount Lemmon Survey ||  || align=right data-sort-value="0.74" | 740 m || 
|-id=098 bgcolor=#d6d6d6
| 603098 ||  || — || June 20, 2013 || Haleakala || Pan-STARRS ||  || align=right | 1.9 km || 
|-id=099 bgcolor=#fefefe
| 603099 ||  || — || February 24, 2008 || Mount Lemmon || Mount Lemmon Survey ||  || align=right data-sort-value="0.46" | 460 m || 
|-id=100 bgcolor=#d6d6d6
| 603100 ||  || — || February 9, 2005 || Kitt Peak || Spacewatch ||  || align=right | 2.7 km || 
|}

603101–603200 

|-bgcolor=#E9E9E9
| 603101 ||  || — || February 23, 2012 || Mount Lemmon || Mount Lemmon Survey ||  || align=right | 1.1 km || 
|-id=102 bgcolor=#fefefe
| 603102 ||  || — || May 2, 2005 || Kitt Peak || Spacewatch ||  || align=right data-sort-value="0.68" | 680 m || 
|-id=103 bgcolor=#E9E9E9
| 603103 ||  || — || April 19, 2012 || Mount Lemmon || Mount Lemmon Survey ||  || align=right data-sort-value="0.78" | 780 m || 
|-id=104 bgcolor=#fefefe
| 603104 ||  || — || June 3, 2005 || Kitt Peak || Spacewatch ||  || align=right data-sort-value="0.75" | 750 m || 
|-id=105 bgcolor=#d6d6d6
| 603105 ||  || — || October 3, 2014 || Haleakala || Pan-STARRS || Tj (2.99) || align=right | 2.6 km || 
|-id=106 bgcolor=#fefefe
| 603106 ||  || — || September 12, 2007 || Mount Lemmon || Mount Lemmon Survey ||  || align=right data-sort-value="0.69" | 690 m || 
|-id=107 bgcolor=#E9E9E9
| 603107 ||  || — || November 16, 2010 || Charleston || R. Holmes ||  || align=right | 1.4 km || 
|-id=108 bgcolor=#C2E0FF
| 603108 ||  || — || October 7, 2010 || Haleakala || Pan-STARRS || other TNOcritical || align=right | 202 km || 
|-id=109 bgcolor=#E9E9E9
| 603109 ||  || — || November 20, 2014 || Haleakala || Pan-STARRS ||  || align=right | 1.1 km || 
|-id=110 bgcolor=#d6d6d6
| 603110 ||  || — || November 21, 2014 || Haleakala || Pan-STARRS || Tj (2.91) || align=right | 3.7 km || 
|-id=111 bgcolor=#fefefe
| 603111 ||  || — || November 22, 2014 || Haleakala || Pan-STARRS ||  || align=right data-sort-value="0.51" | 510 m || 
|-id=112 bgcolor=#fefefe
| 603112 ||  || — || November 21, 2014 || Haleakala || Pan-STARRS ||  || align=right data-sort-value="0.48" | 480 m || 
|-id=113 bgcolor=#d6d6d6
| 603113 ||  || — || November 22, 2014 || Haleakala || Pan-STARRS ||  || align=right | 2.6 km || 
|-id=114 bgcolor=#fefefe
| 603114 ||  || — || November 20, 2014 || Haleakala || Pan-STARRS ||  || align=right data-sort-value="0.57" | 570 m || 
|-id=115 bgcolor=#d6d6d6
| 603115 ||  || — || November 21, 2014 || Haleakala || Pan-STARRS || 3:2 || align=right | 4.1 km || 
|-id=116 bgcolor=#d6d6d6
| 603116 ||  || — || November 16, 2014 || Mount Lemmon || Mount Lemmon Survey ||  || align=right | 2.0 km || 
|-id=117 bgcolor=#E9E9E9
| 603117 ||  || — || November 29, 2014 || Mount Lemmon || Mount Lemmon Survey ||  || align=right | 1.6 km || 
|-id=118 bgcolor=#d6d6d6
| 603118 ||  || — || November 26, 2014 || Haleakala || Pan-STARRS ||  || align=right | 2.1 km || 
|-id=119 bgcolor=#d6d6d6
| 603119 ||  || — || November 21, 2014 || Haleakala || Pan-STARRS ||  || align=right | 2.0 km || 
|-id=120 bgcolor=#d6d6d6
| 603120 ||  || — || November 29, 2014 || Mount Lemmon || Mount Lemmon Survey ||  || align=right | 1.7 km || 
|-id=121 bgcolor=#E9E9E9
| 603121 ||  || — || March 21, 2004 || Kitt Peak || Spacewatch ||  || align=right | 1.7 km || 
|-id=122 bgcolor=#E9E9E9
| 603122 ||  || — || November 26, 2014 || Haleakala || Pan-STARRS ||  || align=right data-sort-value="0.80" | 800 m || 
|-id=123 bgcolor=#d6d6d6
| 603123 ||  || — || January 19, 2008 || Mount Lemmon || Mount Lemmon Survey || 3:2 || align=right | 4.7 km || 
|-id=124 bgcolor=#fefefe
| 603124 ||  || — || October 21, 2007 || Mount Lemmon || Mount Lemmon Survey ||  || align=right data-sort-value="0.72" | 720 m || 
|-id=125 bgcolor=#fefefe
| 603125 ||  || — || December 31, 2007 || Kitt Peak || Spacewatch ||  || align=right data-sort-value="0.46" | 460 m || 
|-id=126 bgcolor=#E9E9E9
| 603126 ||  || — || November 20, 2001 || Anderson Mesa || LONEOS ||  || align=right | 1.3 km || 
|-id=127 bgcolor=#fefefe
| 603127 ||  || — || January 18, 2012 || Mount Lemmon || Mount Lemmon Survey ||  || align=right data-sort-value="0.47" | 470 m || 
|-id=128 bgcolor=#C2FFFF
| 603128 ||  || — || October 2, 2013 || Haleakala || Pan-STARRS || L5 || align=right | 7.3 km || 
|-id=129 bgcolor=#E9E9E9
| 603129 ||  || — || November 22, 2006 || Mount Lemmon || Mount Lemmon Survey ||  || align=right data-sort-value="0.67" | 670 m || 
|-id=130 bgcolor=#fefefe
| 603130 ||  || — || June 8, 2002 || Socorro || LINEAR ||  || align=right data-sort-value="0.95" | 950 m || 
|-id=131 bgcolor=#E9E9E9
| 603131 ||  || — || September 13, 2005 || Kitt Peak || Spacewatch ||  || align=right | 1.3 km || 
|-id=132 bgcolor=#fefefe
| 603132 ||  || — || February 28, 2008 || Mount Lemmon || Mount Lemmon Survey ||  || align=right data-sort-value="0.58" | 580 m || 
|-id=133 bgcolor=#fefefe
| 603133 ||  || — || November 29, 2014 || Mount Lemmon || Mount Lemmon Survey ||  || align=right data-sort-value="0.67" | 670 m || 
|-id=134 bgcolor=#E9E9E9
| 603134 ||  || — || December 13, 2014 || Haleakala || Pan-STARRS ||  || align=right | 1.4 km || 
|-id=135 bgcolor=#E9E9E9
| 603135 ||  || — || March 3, 2003 || Palomar || NEAT ||  || align=right | 1.4 km || 
|-id=136 bgcolor=#fefefe
| 603136 ||  || — || April 15, 2005 || Kitt Peak || Spacewatch ||  || align=right data-sort-value="0.69" | 690 m || 
|-id=137 bgcolor=#fefefe
| 603137 ||  || — || August 30, 2013 || Haleakala || Pan-STARRS || H || align=right data-sort-value="0.61" | 610 m || 
|-id=138 bgcolor=#E9E9E9
| 603138 ||  || — || December 2, 2014 || Haleakala || Pan-STARRS ||  || align=right | 1.1 km || 
|-id=139 bgcolor=#E9E9E9
| 603139 ||  || — || October 18, 2009 || Mount Lemmon || Mount Lemmon Survey ||  || align=right | 1.6 km || 
|-id=140 bgcolor=#fefefe
| 603140 ||  || — || December 19, 2014 || ESA OGS || ESA OGS ||  || align=right data-sort-value="0.63" | 630 m || 
|-id=141 bgcolor=#E9E9E9
| 603141 ||  || — || December 20, 2014 || Haleakala || Pan-STARRS ||  || align=right | 1.8 km || 
|-id=142 bgcolor=#fefefe
| 603142 ||  || — || March 11, 2008 || Mount Lemmon || Mount Lemmon Survey ||  || align=right data-sort-value="0.61" | 610 m || 
|-id=143 bgcolor=#fefefe
| 603143 ||  || — || January 12, 2008 || Mount Lemmon || Mount Lemmon Survey ||  || align=right data-sort-value="0.93" | 930 m || 
|-id=144 bgcolor=#d6d6d6
| 603144 ||  || — || October 10, 2008 || Mount Lemmon || Mount Lemmon Survey ||  || align=right | 2.1 km || 
|-id=145 bgcolor=#fefefe
| 603145 ||  || — || October 23, 2003 || Kitt Peak || L. H. Wasserman, D. E. Trilling ||  || align=right data-sort-value="0.75" | 750 m || 
|-id=146 bgcolor=#fefefe
| 603146 ||  || — || December 10, 2014 || Mount Lemmon || Mount Lemmon Survey ||  || align=right data-sort-value="0.71" | 710 m || 
|-id=147 bgcolor=#E9E9E9
| 603147 ||  || — || November 8, 2009 || Mount Lemmon || Mount Lemmon Survey ||  || align=right | 2.0 km || 
|-id=148 bgcolor=#fefefe
| 603148 ||  || — || December 29, 2003 || Anderson Mesa || LONEOS || H || align=right data-sort-value="0.65" | 650 m || 
|-id=149 bgcolor=#fefefe
| 603149 ||  || — || November 16, 2003 || Kitt Peak || Spacewatch ||  || align=right data-sort-value="0.62" | 620 m || 
|-id=150 bgcolor=#E9E9E9
| 603150 ||  || — || January 11, 2011 || Mount Lemmon || Mount Lemmon Survey ||  || align=right | 1.2 km || 
|-id=151 bgcolor=#E9E9E9
| 603151 ||  || — || December 21, 2014 || Haleakala || Pan-STARRS ||  || align=right | 1.5 km || 
|-id=152 bgcolor=#E9E9E9
| 603152 ||  || — || November 26, 2013 || Nogales || M. Schwartz, P. R. Holvorcem ||  || align=right | 2.1 km || 
|-id=153 bgcolor=#fefefe
| 603153 ||  || — || January 4, 2003 || Kitt Peak || I. dell'Antonio, D. Loomba ||  || align=right data-sort-value="0.81" | 810 m || 
|-id=154 bgcolor=#E9E9E9
| 603154 ||  || — || December 26, 2014 || Haleakala || Pan-STARRS ||  || align=right data-sort-value="0.77" | 770 m || 
|-id=155 bgcolor=#fefefe
| 603155 ||  || — || August 4, 2005 || Palomar || NEAT ||  || align=right data-sort-value="0.86" | 860 m || 
|-id=156 bgcolor=#fefefe
| 603156 ||  || — || December 29, 2014 || Haleakala || Pan-STARRS ||  || align=right data-sort-value="0.49" | 490 m || 
|-id=157 bgcolor=#d6d6d6
| 603157 ||  || — || December 16, 2014 || Haleakala || Pan-STARRS ||  || align=right | 2.3 km || 
|-id=158 bgcolor=#d6d6d6
| 603158 ||  || — || December 29, 2014 || Haleakala || Pan-STARRS ||  || align=right | 1.6 km || 
|-id=159 bgcolor=#fefefe
| 603159 ||  || — || December 29, 2014 || Haleakala || Pan-STARRS ||  || align=right data-sort-value="0.55" | 550 m || 
|-id=160 bgcolor=#d6d6d6
| 603160 ||  || — || December 21, 2014 || Haleakala || Pan-STARRS ||  || align=right | 2.4 km || 
|-id=161 bgcolor=#E9E9E9
| 603161 ||  || — || May 14, 2004 || Kitt Peak || Spacewatch ||  || align=right | 1.1 km || 
|-id=162 bgcolor=#E9E9E9
| 603162 ||  || — || November 10, 2005 || Catalina || CSS ||  || align=right | 1.4 km || 
|-id=163 bgcolor=#E9E9E9
| 603163 ||  || — || September 25, 2009 || Catalina || CSS ||  || align=right | 1.4 km || 
|-id=164 bgcolor=#E9E9E9
| 603164 ||  || — || February 7, 2007 || Kitt Peak || Spacewatch ||  || align=right data-sort-value="0.77" | 770 m || 
|-id=165 bgcolor=#fefefe
| 603165 ||  || — || September 21, 2003 || Kitt Peak || Spacewatch ||  || align=right data-sort-value="0.46" | 460 m || 
|-id=166 bgcolor=#fefefe
| 603166 ||  || — || October 12, 2010 || Mount Lemmon || Mount Lemmon Survey ||  || align=right data-sort-value="0.74" | 740 m || 
|-id=167 bgcolor=#E9E9E9
| 603167 ||  || — || January 12, 2015 || Haleakala || Pan-STARRS ||  || align=right data-sort-value="0.80" | 800 m || 
|-id=168 bgcolor=#fefefe
| 603168 ||  || — || March 17, 2004 || Kitt Peak || Spacewatch ||  || align=right data-sort-value="0.54" | 540 m || 
|-id=169 bgcolor=#d6d6d6
| 603169 ||  || — || December 29, 2014 || Mount Lemmon || Mount Lemmon Survey || 3:2 || align=right | 3.2 km || 
|-id=170 bgcolor=#fefefe
| 603170 ||  || — || September 28, 2006 || Kitt Peak || Spacewatch ||  || align=right data-sort-value="0.75" | 750 m || 
|-id=171 bgcolor=#fefefe
| 603171 ||  || — || November 15, 2006 || Mount Lemmon || Mount Lemmon Survey ||  || align=right data-sort-value="0.70" | 700 m || 
|-id=172 bgcolor=#fefefe
| 603172 ||  || — || April 3, 2008 || Kitt Peak || Spacewatch ||  || align=right data-sort-value="0.74" | 740 m || 
|-id=173 bgcolor=#fefefe
| 603173 ||  || — || October 30, 2010 || Piszkesteto || Z. Kuli, K. Sárneczky ||  || align=right data-sort-value="0.74" | 740 m || 
|-id=174 bgcolor=#fefefe
| 603174 ||  || — || March 16, 2012 || Mount Lemmon || Mount Lemmon Survey ||  || align=right data-sort-value="0.63" | 630 m || 
|-id=175 bgcolor=#fefefe
| 603175 ||  || — || October 20, 2007 || Mount Lemmon || Mount Lemmon Survey ||  || align=right data-sort-value="0.54" | 540 m || 
|-id=176 bgcolor=#fefefe
| 603176 ||  || — || October 29, 2010 || Kitt Peak || Spacewatch ||  || align=right data-sort-value="0.76" | 760 m || 
|-id=177 bgcolor=#d6d6d6
| 603177 ||  || — || September 13, 2007 || Mount Lemmon || Mount Lemmon Survey ||  || align=right | 2.2 km || 
|-id=178 bgcolor=#fefefe
| 603178 ||  || — || May 26, 2008 || Kitt Peak || Spacewatch ||  || align=right data-sort-value="0.86" | 860 m || 
|-id=179 bgcolor=#d6d6d6
| 603179 ||  || — || December 21, 2014 || Haleakala || Pan-STARRS ||  || align=right | 2.1 km || 
|-id=180 bgcolor=#E9E9E9
| 603180 ||  || — || January 27, 2007 || Kitt Peak || Spacewatch ||  || align=right data-sort-value="0.74" | 740 m || 
|-id=181 bgcolor=#fefefe
| 603181 ||  || — || July 14, 2013 || Haleakala || Pan-STARRS ||  || align=right data-sort-value="0.70" | 700 m || 
|-id=182 bgcolor=#E9E9E9
| 603182 ||  || — || November 10, 2009 || Kitt Peak || Spacewatch ||  || align=right | 1.5 km || 
|-id=183 bgcolor=#fefefe
| 603183 ||  || — || January 19, 2012 || Haleakala || Pan-STARRS ||  || align=right data-sort-value="0.50" | 500 m || 
|-id=184 bgcolor=#fefefe
| 603184 ||  || — || March 4, 2012 || Kitt Peak || Spacewatch ||  || align=right data-sort-value="0.74" | 740 m || 
|-id=185 bgcolor=#fefefe
| 603185 ||  || — || September 25, 2003 || Palomar || NEAT ||  || align=right data-sort-value="0.71" | 710 m || 
|-id=186 bgcolor=#E9E9E9
| 603186 ||  || — || December 23, 2014 || Kitt Peak || Spacewatch ||  || align=right | 1.8 km || 
|-id=187 bgcolor=#d6d6d6
| 603187 ||  || — || December 21, 2014 || Haleakala || Pan-STARRS ||  || align=right | 2.4 km || 
|-id=188 bgcolor=#d6d6d6
| 603188 ||  || — || October 2, 2013 || Mount Lemmon || Mount Lemmon Survey ||  || align=right | 1.6 km || 
|-id=189 bgcolor=#d6d6d6
| 603189 ||  || — || October 8, 2007 || Mount Lemmon || Mount Lemmon Survey ||  || align=right | 2.3 km || 
|-id=190 bgcolor=#fefefe
| 603190 ||  || — || April 30, 2012 || Mount Lemmon || Mount Lemmon Survey ||  || align=right data-sort-value="0.58" | 580 m || 
|-id=191 bgcolor=#fefefe
| 603191 ||  || — || December 26, 2014 || Haleakala || Pan-STARRS || H || align=right data-sort-value="0.50" | 500 m || 
|-id=192 bgcolor=#d6d6d6
| 603192 ||  || — || September 13, 2013 || Mount Lemmon || Mount Lemmon Survey ||  || align=right | 1.9 km || 
|-id=193 bgcolor=#E9E9E9
| 603193 ||  || — || January 24, 2006 || Kitt Peak || Spacewatch ||  || align=right | 1.8 km || 
|-id=194 bgcolor=#fefefe
| 603194 ||  || — || March 30, 2008 || Kitt Peak || Spacewatch ||  || align=right data-sort-value="0.61" | 610 m || 
|-id=195 bgcolor=#E9E9E9
| 603195 ||  || — || October 22, 2009 || Mount Lemmon || Mount Lemmon Survey ||  || align=right | 1.3 km || 
|-id=196 bgcolor=#E9E9E9
| 603196 ||  || — || April 24, 2007 || Mount Lemmon || Mount Lemmon Survey ||  || align=right | 1.2 km || 
|-id=197 bgcolor=#E9E9E9
| 603197 ||  || — || January 14, 2015 || Haleakala || Pan-STARRS ||  || align=right | 1.7 km || 
|-id=198 bgcolor=#d6d6d6
| 603198 ||  || — || August 24, 2008 || Kitt Peak || Spacewatch ||  || align=right | 1.8 km || 
|-id=199 bgcolor=#d6d6d6
| 603199 ||  || — || April 25, 2007 || Mount Lemmon || Mount Lemmon Survey ||  || align=right | 2.1 km || 
|-id=200 bgcolor=#fefefe
| 603200 Yuchichung ||  ||  || July 5, 2006 || Lulin || LUSS ||  || align=right | 1.0 km || 
|}

603201–603300 

|-bgcolor=#d6d6d6
| 603201 ||  || — || January 15, 2015 || Haleakala || Pan-STARRS ||  || align=right | 2.3 km || 
|-id=202 bgcolor=#fefefe
| 603202 ||  || — || April 7, 2005 || Mount Lemmon || Mount Lemmon Survey ||  || align=right data-sort-value="0.85" | 850 m || 
|-id=203 bgcolor=#fefefe
| 603203 ||  || — || February 13, 2008 || Kitt Peak || Spacewatch || ERI || align=right | 1.0 km || 
|-id=204 bgcolor=#d6d6d6
| 603204 ||  || — || September 10, 2007 || Mount Lemmon || Mount Lemmon Survey ||  || align=right | 2.3 km || 
|-id=205 bgcolor=#fefefe
| 603205 ||  || — || January 15, 2015 || Haleakala || Pan-STARRS ||  || align=right data-sort-value="0.79" | 790 m || 
|-id=206 bgcolor=#fefefe
| 603206 ||  || — || September 19, 2006 || Catalina || CSS ||  || align=right data-sort-value="0.68" | 680 m || 
|-id=207 bgcolor=#E9E9E9
| 603207 ||  || — || March 16, 2007 || Catalina || CSS ||  || align=right | 1.1 km || 
|-id=208 bgcolor=#fefefe
| 603208 ||  || — || November 27, 2014 || Haleakala || Pan-STARRS ||  || align=right data-sort-value="0.85" | 850 m || 
|-id=209 bgcolor=#fefefe
| 603209 ||  || — || March 2, 2012 || Mount Lemmon || Mount Lemmon Survey ||  || align=right data-sort-value="0.67" | 670 m || 
|-id=210 bgcolor=#fefefe
| 603210 ||  || — || March 16, 2012 || Kitt Peak || Spacewatch ||  || align=right data-sort-value="0.60" | 600 m || 
|-id=211 bgcolor=#fefefe
| 603211 ||  || — || November 11, 2004 || Kitt Peak || Spacewatch ||  || align=right data-sort-value="0.80" | 800 m || 
|-id=212 bgcolor=#fefefe
| 603212 ||  || — || August 17, 2006 || Palomar || NEAT ||  || align=right data-sort-value="0.99" | 990 m || 
|-id=213 bgcolor=#fefefe
| 603213 ||  || — || October 17, 2003 || Kitt Peak || Spacewatch ||  || align=right data-sort-value="0.67" | 670 m || 
|-id=214 bgcolor=#fefefe
| 603214 ||  || — || July 27, 2011 || Haleakala || Pan-STARRS || H || align=right data-sort-value="0.45" | 450 m || 
|-id=215 bgcolor=#fefefe
| 603215 ||  || — || March 2, 2008 || Kitt Peak || Spacewatch ||  || align=right data-sort-value="0.60" | 600 m || 
|-id=216 bgcolor=#E9E9E9
| 603216 ||  || — || January 14, 2015 || Haleakala || Pan-STARRS ||  || align=right | 1.7 km || 
|-id=217 bgcolor=#fefefe
| 603217 ||  || — || October 2, 2006 || Kitt Peak || Spacewatch ||  || align=right data-sort-value="0.91" | 910 m || 
|-id=218 bgcolor=#d6d6d6
| 603218 ||  || — || December 21, 2014 || Haleakala || Pan-STARRS ||  || align=right | 1.9 km || 
|-id=219 bgcolor=#fefefe
| 603219 ||  || — || October 23, 2006 || Kitt Peak || Spacewatch ||  || align=right data-sort-value="0.70" | 700 m || 
|-id=220 bgcolor=#E9E9E9
| 603220 ||  || — || April 1, 2003 || Apache Point || SDSS Collaboration ||  || align=right | 1.7 km || 
|-id=221 bgcolor=#E9E9E9
| 603221 ||  || — || October 27, 2009 || Kitt Peak || Spacewatch ||  || align=right | 2.0 km || 
|-id=222 bgcolor=#fefefe
| 603222 ||  || — || July 15, 2013 || Haleakala || Pan-STARRS ||  || align=right data-sort-value="0.74" | 740 m || 
|-id=223 bgcolor=#fefefe
| 603223 ||  || — || November 23, 2006 || Kitt Peak || Spacewatch ||  || align=right data-sort-value="0.87" | 870 m || 
|-id=224 bgcolor=#d6d6d6
| 603224 ||  || — || August 6, 2005 || Palomar || NEAT || Tj (2.81) || align=right | 3.9 km || 
|-id=225 bgcolor=#E9E9E9
| 603225 ||  || — || September 6, 2008 || Kitt Peak || Spacewatch ||  || align=right | 1.7 km || 
|-id=226 bgcolor=#fefefe
| 603226 ||  || — || January 17, 2004 || Palomar || NEAT ||  || align=right data-sort-value="0.71" | 710 m || 
|-id=227 bgcolor=#d6d6d6
| 603227 ||  || — || January 13, 2010 || Mount Lemmon || Mount Lemmon Survey ||  || align=right | 2.0 km || 
|-id=228 bgcolor=#d6d6d6
| 603228 ||  || — || January 16, 2015 || Haleakala || Pan-STARRS ||  || align=right | 2.1 km || 
|-id=229 bgcolor=#d6d6d6
| 603229 ||  || — || December 31, 2008 || Kitt Peak || Spacewatch ||  || align=right | 2.3 km || 
|-id=230 bgcolor=#E9E9E9
| 603230 ||  || — || January 23, 2006 || Kitt Peak || Spacewatch ||  || align=right | 2.0 km || 
|-id=231 bgcolor=#fefefe
| 603231 ||  || — || November 1, 2006 || Mount Lemmon || Mount Lemmon Survey ||  || align=right data-sort-value="0.65" | 650 m || 
|-id=232 bgcolor=#fefefe
| 603232 ||  || — || May 1, 2009 || Mount Lemmon || Mount Lemmon Survey ||  || align=right data-sort-value="0.51" | 510 m || 
|-id=233 bgcolor=#fefefe
| 603233 ||  || — || February 16, 2012 || Haleakala || Pan-STARRS ||  || align=right data-sort-value="0.68" | 680 m || 
|-id=234 bgcolor=#E9E9E9
| 603234 ||  || — || January 16, 2015 || Haleakala || Pan-STARRS ||  || align=right | 2.1 km || 
|-id=235 bgcolor=#E9E9E9
| 603235 ||  || — || January 16, 2015 || Haleakala || Pan-STARRS ||  || align=right data-sort-value="0.94" | 940 m || 
|-id=236 bgcolor=#E9E9E9
| 603236 ||  || — || October 10, 2012 || Mount Lemmon || Mount Lemmon Survey ||  || align=right | 2.1 km || 
|-id=237 bgcolor=#E9E9E9
| 603237 ||  || — || March 11, 2011 || Kitt Peak || Spacewatch ||  || align=right | 1.9 km || 
|-id=238 bgcolor=#E9E9E9
| 603238 ||  || — || November 16, 2009 || Mount Lemmon || Mount Lemmon Survey ||  || align=right | 2.3 km || 
|-id=239 bgcolor=#E9E9E9
| 603239 ||  || — || June 17, 2013 || Haleakala || Pan-STARRS ||  || align=right | 1.1 km || 
|-id=240 bgcolor=#E9E9E9
| 603240 ||  || — || July 12, 2001 || Palomar || NEAT ||  || align=right | 1.4 km || 
|-id=241 bgcolor=#fefefe
| 603241 ||  || — || February 21, 2012 || Kitt Peak || Spacewatch ||  || align=right data-sort-value="0.54" | 540 m || 
|-id=242 bgcolor=#fefefe
| 603242 ||  || — || September 4, 2007 || Catalina || CSS ||  || align=right data-sort-value="0.67" | 670 m || 
|-id=243 bgcolor=#fefefe
| 603243 ||  || — || February 9, 2008 || Kitt Peak || Spacewatch ||  || align=right data-sort-value="0.61" | 610 m || 
|-id=244 bgcolor=#E9E9E9
| 603244 ||  || — || October 29, 2005 || Kitt Peak || Spacewatch ||  || align=right data-sort-value="0.87" | 870 m || 
|-id=245 bgcolor=#E9E9E9
| 603245 ||  || — || November 10, 2004 || Kitt Peak || M. W. Buie, L. H. Wasserman ||  || align=right | 2.6 km || 
|-id=246 bgcolor=#fefefe
| 603246 ||  || — || January 15, 2004 || Kitt Peak || Spacewatch ||  || align=right data-sort-value="0.56" | 560 m || 
|-id=247 bgcolor=#E9E9E9
| 603247 ||  || — || March 9, 2007 || Kitt Peak || Spacewatch ||  || align=right data-sort-value="0.68" | 680 m || 
|-id=248 bgcolor=#E9E9E9
| 603248 ||  || — || March 30, 2003 || Kitt Peak || M. W. Buie, A. B. Jordan ||  || align=right data-sort-value="0.85" | 850 m || 
|-id=249 bgcolor=#fefefe
| 603249 ||  || — || January 13, 2008 || Kitt Peak || Spacewatch ||  || align=right data-sort-value="0.71" | 710 m || 
|-id=250 bgcolor=#fefefe
| 603250 ||  || — || February 25, 2012 || Mount Lemmon || Mount Lemmon Survey ||  || align=right data-sort-value="0.94" | 940 m || 
|-id=251 bgcolor=#fefefe
| 603251 ||  || — || March 15, 2004 || Kitt Peak || Spacewatch ||  || align=right data-sort-value="0.57" | 570 m || 
|-id=252 bgcolor=#fefefe
| 603252 ||  || — || October 28, 2010 || Mount Lemmon || Mount Lemmon Survey ||  || align=right data-sort-value="0.59" | 590 m || 
|-id=253 bgcolor=#E9E9E9
| 603253 ||  || — || February 3, 2011 || Piszkesteto || Z. Kuli, K. Sárneczky ||  || align=right data-sort-value="0.68" | 680 m || 
|-id=254 bgcolor=#d6d6d6
| 603254 ||  || — || January 10, 2010 || Kitt Peak || Spacewatch ||  || align=right | 1.8 km || 
|-id=255 bgcolor=#fefefe
| 603255 ||  || — || November 27, 2014 || Mount Lemmon || Mount Lemmon Survey ||  || align=right data-sort-value="0.87" | 870 m || 
|-id=256 bgcolor=#E9E9E9
| 603256 ||  || — || February 7, 2011 || Mount Lemmon || Mount Lemmon Survey ||  || align=right data-sort-value="0.80" | 800 m || 
|-id=257 bgcolor=#fefefe
| 603257 ||  || — || January 16, 2015 || Haleakala || Pan-STARRS ||  || align=right data-sort-value="0.74" | 740 m || 
|-id=258 bgcolor=#E9E9E9
| 603258 ||  || — || January 16, 2015 || Haleakala || Pan-STARRS ||  || align=right | 1.4 km || 
|-id=259 bgcolor=#fefefe
| 603259 ||  || — || May 28, 2012 || Mount Lemmon || Mount Lemmon Survey ||  || align=right data-sort-value="0.96" | 960 m || 
|-id=260 bgcolor=#d6d6d6
| 603260 ||  || — || September 28, 2013 || Piszkesteto || K. Sárneczky ||  || align=right | 2.0 km || 
|-id=261 bgcolor=#fefefe
| 603261 ||  || — || July 9, 2013 || Haleakala || Pan-STARRS || H || align=right data-sort-value="0.49" | 490 m || 
|-id=262 bgcolor=#d6d6d6
| 603262 ||  || — || January 17, 2015 || Haleakala || Pan-STARRS ||  || align=right | 2.0 km || 
|-id=263 bgcolor=#E9E9E9
| 603263 ||  || — || October 12, 1993 || Kitt Peak || Spacewatch ||  || align=right data-sort-value="0.82" | 820 m || 
|-id=264 bgcolor=#E9E9E9
| 603264 ||  || — || January 17, 2015 || Haleakala || Pan-STARRS ||  || align=right | 1.1 km || 
|-id=265 bgcolor=#E9E9E9
| 603265 ||  || — || October 6, 2004 || Kitt Peak || Spacewatch ||  || align=right | 1.8 km || 
|-id=266 bgcolor=#fefefe
| 603266 ||  || — || January 17, 2015 || Haleakala || Pan-STARRS ||  || align=right data-sort-value="0.63" | 630 m || 
|-id=267 bgcolor=#fefefe
| 603267 ||  || — || February 12, 2004 || Kitt Peak || Spacewatch || MAS || align=right data-sort-value="0.68" | 680 m || 
|-id=268 bgcolor=#fefefe
| 603268 ||  || — || January 17, 2015 || Haleakala || Pan-STARRS ||  || align=right data-sort-value="0.56" | 560 m || 
|-id=269 bgcolor=#fefefe
| 603269 ||  || — || January 17, 2015 || Haleakala || Pan-STARRS ||  || align=right data-sort-value="0.68" | 680 m || 
|-id=270 bgcolor=#fefefe
| 603270 ||  || — || September 3, 2013 || Mount Lemmon || Mount Lemmon Survey ||  || align=right data-sort-value="0.62" | 620 m || 
|-id=271 bgcolor=#fefefe
| 603271 ||  || — || February 2, 2008 || Mount Lemmon || Mount Lemmon Survey ||  || align=right data-sort-value="0.64" | 640 m || 
|-id=272 bgcolor=#E9E9E9
| 603272 ||  || — || May 28, 2012 || Mount Lemmon || Mount Lemmon Survey ||  || align=right | 1.5 km || 
|-id=273 bgcolor=#fefefe
| 603273 ||  || — || November 9, 2007 || Kitt Peak || Spacewatch ||  || align=right data-sort-value="0.55" | 550 m || 
|-id=274 bgcolor=#d6d6d6
| 603274 ||  || — || September 13, 2013 || Catalina || CSS ||  || align=right | 2.3 km || 
|-id=275 bgcolor=#fefefe
| 603275 ||  || — || January 14, 2011 || Mount Lemmon || Mount Lemmon Survey ||  || align=right data-sort-value="0.72" | 720 m || 
|-id=276 bgcolor=#fefefe
| 603276 ||  || — || December 13, 2010 || Mauna Kea || L. Wells, M. Micheli ||  || align=right data-sort-value="0.98" | 980 m || 
|-id=277 bgcolor=#E9E9E9
| 603277 ||  || — || July 18, 2012 || Mayhill-ISON || L. Elenin ||  || align=right data-sort-value="0.91" | 910 m || 
|-id=278 bgcolor=#fefefe
| 603278 ||  || — || October 23, 2003 || Apache Point || SDSS Collaboration ||  || align=right data-sort-value="0.65" | 650 m || 
|-id=279 bgcolor=#E9E9E9
| 603279 ||  || — || December 4, 2005 || Kitt Peak || Spacewatch ||  || align=right | 1.6 km || 
|-id=280 bgcolor=#fefefe
| 603280 ||  || — || November 8, 2007 || Kitt Peak || Spacewatch ||  || align=right data-sort-value="0.57" | 570 m || 
|-id=281 bgcolor=#fefefe
| 603281 ||  || — || February 9, 2008 || Kitt Peak || Spacewatch ||  || align=right data-sort-value="0.79" | 790 m || 
|-id=282 bgcolor=#fefefe
| 603282 ||  || — || December 26, 2014 || Haleakala || Pan-STARRS ||  || align=right data-sort-value="0.88" | 880 m || 
|-id=283 bgcolor=#E9E9E9
| 603283 ||  || — || November 9, 2009 || Kitt Peak || Spacewatch ||  || align=right | 1.5 km || 
|-id=284 bgcolor=#fefefe
| 603284 ||  || — || February 9, 2008 || Kitt Peak || Spacewatch ||  || align=right data-sort-value="0.60" | 600 m || 
|-id=285 bgcolor=#d6d6d6
| 603285 ||  || — || September 5, 2013 || Kitt Peak || Spacewatch ||  || align=right | 2.0 km || 
|-id=286 bgcolor=#E9E9E9
| 603286 ||  || — || December 25, 2005 || Kitt Peak || Spacewatch ||  || align=right | 1.5 km || 
|-id=287 bgcolor=#d6d6d6
| 603287 ||  || — || April 4, 2005 || Mount Lemmon || Mount Lemmon Survey ||  || align=right | 2.5 km || 
|-id=288 bgcolor=#fefefe
| 603288 ||  || — || May 20, 2005 || Mount Lemmon || Mount Lemmon Survey ||  || align=right data-sort-value="0.68" | 680 m || 
|-id=289 bgcolor=#fefefe
| 603289 ||  || — || December 21, 2014 || Haleakala || Pan-STARRS ||  || align=right data-sort-value="0.61" | 610 m || 
|-id=290 bgcolor=#fefefe
| 603290 ||  || — || January 18, 2008 || Kitt Peak || Spacewatch ||  || align=right data-sort-value="0.56" | 560 m || 
|-id=291 bgcolor=#d6d6d6
| 603291 ||  || — || January 18, 2015 || Haleakala || Pan-STARRS ||  || align=right | 2.3 km || 
|-id=292 bgcolor=#fefefe
| 603292 ||  || — || August 12, 2013 || Haleakala || Pan-STARRS ||  || align=right data-sort-value="0.89" | 890 m || 
|-id=293 bgcolor=#E9E9E9
| 603293 ||  || — || February 4, 2003 || La Silla ||  ||  || align=right data-sort-value="0.84" | 840 m || 
|-id=294 bgcolor=#fefefe
| 603294 ||  || — || July 9, 2005 || Kitt Peak || Spacewatch || NYS || align=right data-sort-value="0.63" | 630 m || 
|-id=295 bgcolor=#d6d6d6
| 603295 ||  || — || December 18, 2014 || Haleakala || Pan-STARRS ||  || align=right | 2.3 km || 
|-id=296 bgcolor=#fefefe
| 603296 ||  || — || April 29, 2008 || Mount Lemmon || Mount Lemmon Survey || NYS || align=right data-sort-value="0.76" | 760 m || 
|-id=297 bgcolor=#fefefe
| 603297 ||  || — || February 7, 2008 || Mount Lemmon || Mount Lemmon Survey ||  || align=right data-sort-value="0.75" | 750 m || 
|-id=298 bgcolor=#d6d6d6
| 603298 ||  || — || January 18, 2015 || Haleakala || Pan-STARRS ||  || align=right | 2.3 km || 
|-id=299 bgcolor=#fefefe
| 603299 ||  || — || May 12, 1997 || Mauna Kea || C. Veillet ||  || align=right | 1.2 km || 
|-id=300 bgcolor=#fefefe
| 603300 ||  || — || March 11, 2008 || Kitt Peak || Spacewatch ||  || align=right data-sort-value="0.67" | 670 m || 
|}

603301–603400 

|-bgcolor=#d6d6d6
| 603301 ||  || — || May 30, 2006 || Mount Lemmon || Mount Lemmon Survey ||  || align=right | 2.8 km || 
|-id=302 bgcolor=#E9E9E9
| 603302 ||  || — || January 19, 2015 || Haleakala || Pan-STARRS ||  || align=right | 1.2 km || 
|-id=303 bgcolor=#fefefe
| 603303 ||  || — || July 7, 2013 || Kitt Peak || Spacewatch ||  || align=right data-sort-value="0.69" | 690 m || 
|-id=304 bgcolor=#fefefe
| 603304 ||  || — || May 13, 2004 || Palomar || NEAT ||  || align=right | 1.0 km || 
|-id=305 bgcolor=#E9E9E9
| 603305 ||  || — || April 25, 2007 || Mount Lemmon || Mount Lemmon Survey ||  || align=right data-sort-value="0.88" | 880 m || 
|-id=306 bgcolor=#fefefe
| 603306 ||  || — || May 27, 2008 || Kitt Peak || Spacewatch ||  || align=right data-sort-value="0.80" | 800 m || 
|-id=307 bgcolor=#d6d6d6
| 603307 ||  || — || January 20, 2015 || Mount Lemmon || Mount Lemmon Survey ||  || align=right | 2.3 km || 
|-id=308 bgcolor=#E9E9E9
| 603308 ||  || — || January 20, 2015 || Mount Lemmon || Mount Lemmon Survey ||  || align=right data-sort-value="0.91" | 910 m || 
|-id=309 bgcolor=#fefefe
| 603309 ||  || — || July 14, 2013 || Haleakala || Pan-STARRS ||  || align=right data-sort-value="0.66" | 660 m || 
|-id=310 bgcolor=#E9E9E9
| 603310 ||  || — || September 5, 2000 || Kitt Peak || Spacewatch ||  || align=right data-sort-value="0.78" | 780 m || 
|-id=311 bgcolor=#E9E9E9
| 603311 ||  || — || August 22, 2004 || Kitt Peak || Spacewatch ||  || align=right data-sort-value="0.83" | 830 m || 
|-id=312 bgcolor=#fefefe
| 603312 ||  || — || September 27, 2006 || Kitt Peak || Spacewatch ||  || align=right data-sort-value="0.51" | 510 m || 
|-id=313 bgcolor=#E9E9E9
| 603313 ||  || — || January 17, 2015 || Haleakala || Pan-STARRS ||  || align=right | 1.2 km || 
|-id=314 bgcolor=#E9E9E9
| 603314 ||  || — || April 7, 2003 || Kitt Peak || Spacewatch ||  || align=right | 1.1 km || 
|-id=315 bgcolor=#E9E9E9
| 603315 ||  || — || January 17, 2015 || Haleakala || Pan-STARRS ||  || align=right | 1.0 km || 
|-id=316 bgcolor=#fefefe
| 603316 ||  || — || January 14, 2008 || Kitt Peak || Spacewatch ||  || align=right data-sort-value="0.56" | 560 m || 
|-id=317 bgcolor=#fefefe
| 603317 ||  || — || February 16, 2004 || Kitt Peak || Spacewatch ||  || align=right data-sort-value="0.72" | 720 m || 
|-id=318 bgcolor=#E9E9E9
| 603318 ||  || — || May 12, 2007 || Mount Lemmon || Mount Lemmon Survey ||  || align=right | 2.0 km || 
|-id=319 bgcolor=#d6d6d6
| 603319 ||  || — || May 8, 2011 || Kitt Peak || Spacewatch ||  || align=right | 2.5 km || 
|-id=320 bgcolor=#E9E9E9
| 603320 ||  || — || August 21, 2004 || Mauna Kea || Mauna Kea Obs. ||  || align=right data-sort-value="0.94" | 940 m || 
|-id=321 bgcolor=#fefefe
| 603321 ||  || — || January 27, 2011 || Mount Lemmon || Mount Lemmon Survey ||  || align=right data-sort-value="0.62" | 620 m || 
|-id=322 bgcolor=#fefefe
| 603322 ||  || — || November 10, 2010 || Mount Lemmon || Mount Lemmon Survey ||  || align=right data-sort-value="0.61" | 610 m || 
|-id=323 bgcolor=#fefefe
| 603323 ||  || — || September 9, 2013 || Haleakala || Pan-STARRS ||  || align=right data-sort-value="0.60" | 600 m || 
|-id=324 bgcolor=#E9E9E9
| 603324 ||  || — || October 3, 2013 || Haleakala || Pan-STARRS ||  || align=right | 1.8 km || 
|-id=325 bgcolor=#fefefe
| 603325 ||  || — || April 28, 2008 || Mount Lemmon || Mount Lemmon Survey ||  || align=right data-sort-value="0.72" | 720 m || 
|-id=326 bgcolor=#fefefe
| 603326 ||  || — || January 20, 2015 || Haleakala || Pan-STARRS ||  || align=right data-sort-value="0.53" | 530 m || 
|-id=327 bgcolor=#fefefe
| 603327 ||  || — || November 4, 2007 || Mount Lemmon || Mount Lemmon Survey ||  || align=right data-sort-value="0.66" | 660 m || 
|-id=328 bgcolor=#E9E9E9
| 603328 ||  || — || November 9, 2013 || Mount Lemmon || Mount Lemmon Survey ||  || align=right data-sort-value="0.83" | 830 m || 
|-id=329 bgcolor=#E9E9E9
| 603329 ||  || — || March 5, 2011 || Mount Lemmon || Mount Lemmon Survey ||  || align=right data-sort-value="0.75" | 750 m || 
|-id=330 bgcolor=#E9E9E9
| 603330 ||  || — || January 20, 2015 || Haleakala || Pan-STARRS ||  || align=right data-sort-value="0.80" | 800 m || 
|-id=331 bgcolor=#fefefe
| 603331 ||  || — || February 12, 2008 || Kitt Peak || Spacewatch ||  || align=right data-sort-value="0.54" | 540 m || 
|-id=332 bgcolor=#fefefe
| 603332 ||  || — || April 21, 2012 || Kitt Peak || Spacewatch ||  || align=right data-sort-value="0.50" | 500 m || 
|-id=333 bgcolor=#E9E9E9
| 603333 ||  || — || March 4, 2011 || Mount Lemmon || Mount Lemmon Survey ||  || align=right data-sort-value="0.82" | 820 m || 
|-id=334 bgcolor=#E9E9E9
| 603334 ||  || — || March 31, 2003 || Apache Point || SDSS Collaboration ||  || align=right data-sort-value="0.91" | 910 m || 
|-id=335 bgcolor=#d6d6d6
| 603335 ||  || — || January 20, 2015 || Haleakala || Pan-STARRS ||  || align=right | 1.7 km || 
|-id=336 bgcolor=#E9E9E9
| 603336 ||  || — || January 20, 2015 || Haleakala || Pan-STARRS ||  || align=right data-sort-value="0.67" | 670 m || 
|-id=337 bgcolor=#E9E9E9
| 603337 ||  || — || March 9, 2011 || Mount Lemmon || Mount Lemmon Survey ||  || align=right data-sort-value="0.81" | 810 m || 
|-id=338 bgcolor=#E9E9E9
| 603338 ||  || — || January 20, 2015 || Haleakala || Pan-STARRS ||  || align=right data-sort-value="0.80" | 800 m || 
|-id=339 bgcolor=#fefefe
| 603339 ||  || — || July 7, 2005 || Mauna Kea || Mauna Kea Obs. ||  || align=right data-sort-value="0.58" | 580 m || 
|-id=340 bgcolor=#E9E9E9
| 603340 ||  || — || January 20, 2015 || Haleakala || Pan-STARRS ||  || align=right | 1.3 km || 
|-id=341 bgcolor=#fefefe
| 603341 ||  || — || August 9, 2013 || Kitt Peak || Spacewatch ||  || align=right data-sort-value="0.62" | 620 m || 
|-id=342 bgcolor=#d6d6d6
| 603342 ||  || — || February 3, 2010 || Sandlot || G. Hug ||  || align=right | 2.0 km || 
|-id=343 bgcolor=#fefefe
| 603343 ||  || — || August 15, 2013 || Haleakala || Pan-STARRS ||  || align=right data-sort-value="0.58" | 580 m || 
|-id=344 bgcolor=#E9E9E9
| 603344 ||  || — || September 18, 2003 || Kitt Peak || Spacewatch ||  || align=right | 1.8 km || 
|-id=345 bgcolor=#fefefe
| 603345 ||  || — || September 19, 2003 || Kitt Peak || Spacewatch ||  || align=right data-sort-value="0.56" | 560 m || 
|-id=346 bgcolor=#d6d6d6
| 603346 ||  || — || November 14, 2013 || Mount Lemmon || Mount Lemmon Survey ||  || align=right | 2.2 km || 
|-id=347 bgcolor=#d6d6d6
| 603347 ||  || — || April 30, 2011 || Mount Lemmon || Mount Lemmon Survey ||  || align=right | 1.9 km || 
|-id=348 bgcolor=#fefefe
| 603348 ||  || — || August 27, 2009 || Kitt Peak || Spacewatch ||  || align=right data-sort-value="0.57" | 570 m || 
|-id=349 bgcolor=#d6d6d6
| 603349 ||  || — || January 20, 2015 || Haleakala || Pan-STARRS ||  || align=right | 2.1 km || 
|-id=350 bgcolor=#E9E9E9
| 603350 ||  || — || October 22, 2014 || Mount Lemmon || Mount Lemmon Survey ||  || align=right | 2.0 km || 
|-id=351 bgcolor=#fefefe
| 603351 ||  || — || September 19, 2009 || Kitt Peak || Spacewatch ||  || align=right data-sort-value="0.86" | 860 m || 
|-id=352 bgcolor=#fefefe
| 603352 ||  || — || December 21, 2014 || Kitt Peak || Spacewatch || H || align=right data-sort-value="0.68" | 680 m || 
|-id=353 bgcolor=#fefefe
| 603353 ||  || — || July 17, 2013 || Haleakala || Pan-STARRS || H || align=right data-sort-value="0.50" | 500 m || 
|-id=354 bgcolor=#E9E9E9
| 603354 ||  || — || January 21, 2015 || Haleakala || Pan-STARRS ||  || align=right data-sort-value="0.93" | 930 m || 
|-id=355 bgcolor=#fefefe
| 603355 ||  || — || January 23, 2015 || Haleakala || Pan-STARRS ||  || align=right data-sort-value="0.54" | 540 m || 
|-id=356 bgcolor=#fefefe
| 603356 ||  || — || March 18, 2004 || Apache Point || SDSS Collaboration ||  || align=right data-sort-value="0.92" | 920 m || 
|-id=357 bgcolor=#E9E9E9
| 603357 ||  || — || May 10, 2007 || Mount Lemmon || Mount Lemmon Survey ||  || align=right | 1.3 km || 
|-id=358 bgcolor=#d6d6d6
| 603358 ||  || — || October 16, 2012 || Kitt Peak || Spacewatch ||  || align=right | 2.9 km || 
|-id=359 bgcolor=#fefefe
| 603359 ||  || — || November 12, 2006 || Mount Lemmon || Mount Lemmon Survey ||  || align=right data-sort-value="0.55" | 550 m || 
|-id=360 bgcolor=#E9E9E9
| 603360 ||  || — || January 20, 2015 || Haleakala || Pan-STARRS ||  || align=right data-sort-value="0.86" | 860 m || 
|-id=361 bgcolor=#E9E9E9
| 603361 ||  || — || January 28, 2015 || Haleakala || Pan-STARRS ||  || align=right | 1.4 km || 
|-id=362 bgcolor=#fefefe
| 603362 ||  || — || November 15, 2006 || Kitt Peak || Spacewatch ||  || align=right data-sort-value="0.95" | 950 m || 
|-id=363 bgcolor=#E9E9E9
| 603363 ||  || — || November 2, 2013 || Mount Lemmon || Mount Lemmon Survey ||  || align=right data-sort-value="0.90" | 900 m || 
|-id=364 bgcolor=#fefefe
| 603364 ||  || — || February 24, 2012 || Kitt Peak || Spacewatch ||  || align=right data-sort-value="0.70" | 700 m || 
|-id=365 bgcolor=#E9E9E9
| 603365 ||  || — || January 26, 2015 || Haleakala || Pan-STARRS ||  || align=right data-sort-value="0.90" | 900 m || 
|-id=366 bgcolor=#fefefe
| 603366 ||  || — || April 5, 2016 || Haleakala || Pan-STARRS ||  || align=right data-sort-value="0.68" | 680 m || 
|-id=367 bgcolor=#E9E9E9
| 603367 ||  || — || February 19, 2002 || Kitt Peak || Spacewatch ||  || align=right | 1.1 km || 
|-id=368 bgcolor=#d6d6d6
| 603368 ||  || — || June 4, 2017 || Mount Lemmon || Mount Lemmon Survey ||  || align=right | 3.3 km || 
|-id=369 bgcolor=#fefefe
| 603369 ||  || — || January 19, 2015 || Catalina || CSS || H || align=right data-sort-value="0.57" | 570 m || 
|-id=370 bgcolor=#C2FFFF
| 603370 ||  || — || January 30, 2015 || Haleakala || Pan-STARRS || L4 || align=right | 7.1 km || 
|-id=371 bgcolor=#E9E9E9
| 603371 ||  || — || June 3, 2011 || Nogales || M. Schwartz, P. R. Holvorcem ||  || align=right | 1.6 km || 
|-id=372 bgcolor=#C2FFFF
| 603372 ||  || — || January 28, 2015 || Haleakala || Pan-STARRS || L4 || align=right | 5.9 km || 
|-id=373 bgcolor=#E9E9E9
| 603373 ||  || — || January 21, 2015 || Haleakala || Pan-STARRS ||  || align=right | 1.1 km || 
|-id=374 bgcolor=#E9E9E9
| 603374 ||  || — || January 28, 2015 || Haleakala || Pan-STARRS ||  || align=right data-sort-value="0.89" | 890 m || 
|-id=375 bgcolor=#C2FFFF
| 603375 ||  || — || January 28, 2015 || Haleakala || Pan-STARRS || L4 || align=right | 6.6 km || 
|-id=376 bgcolor=#fefefe
| 603376 ||  || — || December 21, 2014 || Mount Lemmon || Mount Lemmon Survey ||  || align=right data-sort-value="0.77" | 770 m || 
|-id=377 bgcolor=#fefefe
| 603377 ||  || — || February 28, 2008 || Kitt Peak || Spacewatch ||  || align=right data-sort-value="0.59" | 590 m || 
|-id=378 bgcolor=#fefefe
| 603378 ||  || — || September 1, 2013 || Haleakala || Pan-STARRS ||  || align=right data-sort-value="0.55" | 550 m || 
|-id=379 bgcolor=#fefefe
| 603379 ||  || — || January 18, 2015 || Haleakala || Pan-STARRS || H || align=right data-sort-value="0.57" | 570 m || 
|-id=380 bgcolor=#fefefe
| 603380 ||  || — || February 26, 2008 || Lulin || LUSS ||  || align=right data-sort-value="0.71" | 710 m || 
|-id=381 bgcolor=#fefefe
| 603381 ||  || — || March 5, 2008 || Mount Lemmon || Mount Lemmon Survey ||  || align=right data-sort-value="0.63" | 630 m || 
|-id=382 bgcolor=#E9E9E9
| 603382 ||  || — || August 31, 2005 || Palomar || NEAT ||  || align=right | 1.4 km || 
|-id=383 bgcolor=#fefefe
| 603383 ||  || — || May 23, 2001 || Cerro Tololo || J. L. Elliot, L. H. Wasserman ||  || align=right data-sort-value="0.71" | 710 m || 
|-id=384 bgcolor=#E9E9E9
| 603384 ||  || — || February 2, 2006 || Kitt Peak || Spacewatch ||  || align=right | 2.3 km || 
|-id=385 bgcolor=#fefefe
| 603385 ||  || — || December 2, 2010 || Mount Lemmon || Mount Lemmon Survey ||  || align=right data-sort-value="0.60" | 600 m || 
|-id=386 bgcolor=#fefefe
| 603386 ||  || — || April 15, 2008 || Mount Lemmon || Mount Lemmon Survey ||  || align=right data-sort-value="0.61" | 610 m || 
|-id=387 bgcolor=#E9E9E9
| 603387 ||  || — || March 2, 2011 || Catalina || CSS ||  || align=right data-sort-value="0.87" | 870 m || 
|-id=388 bgcolor=#E9E9E9
| 603388 ||  || — || March 10, 2003 || Palomar || NEAT ||  || align=right | 1.0 km || 
|-id=389 bgcolor=#E9E9E9
| 603389 ||  || — || January 22, 2015 || Haleakala || Pan-STARRS ||  || align=right | 1.0 km || 
|-id=390 bgcolor=#d6d6d6
| 603390 ||  || — || February 1, 2009 || Mount Lemmon || Mount Lemmon Survey ||  || align=right | 2.4 km || 
|-id=391 bgcolor=#E9E9E9
| 603391 ||  || — || April 2, 2011 || Mount Lemmon || Mount Lemmon Survey ||  || align=right | 1.8 km || 
|-id=392 bgcolor=#fefefe
| 603392 ||  || — || October 2, 2006 || Mount Lemmon || Mount Lemmon Survey ||  || align=right data-sort-value="0.81" | 810 m || 
|-id=393 bgcolor=#E9E9E9
| 603393 ||  || — || April 19, 2007 || Mount Lemmon || Mount Lemmon Survey ||  || align=right data-sort-value="0.78" | 780 m || 
|-id=394 bgcolor=#fefefe
| 603394 ||  || — || February 28, 2008 || Kitt Peak || Spacewatch ||  || align=right data-sort-value="0.80" | 800 m || 
|-id=395 bgcolor=#E9E9E9
| 603395 ||  || — || January 25, 2015 || Haleakala || Pan-STARRS ||  || align=right | 1.5 km || 
|-id=396 bgcolor=#E9E9E9
| 603396 ||  || — || March 14, 2011 || Kitt Peak || Spacewatch ||  || align=right | 1.00 km || 
|-id=397 bgcolor=#fefefe
| 603397 ||  || — || August 11, 2012 || Siding Spring || SSS ||  || align=right data-sort-value="0.81" | 810 m || 
|-id=398 bgcolor=#d6d6d6
| 603398 ||  || — || February 23, 2007 || Mount Lemmon || Mount Lemmon Survey || 3:2 || align=right | 4.0 km || 
|-id=399 bgcolor=#fefefe
| 603399 ||  || — || April 6, 2008 || Mount Lemmon || Mount Lemmon Survey ||  || align=right data-sort-value="0.57" | 570 m || 
|-id=400 bgcolor=#fefefe
| 603400 ||  || — || August 21, 2006 || Kitt Peak || Spacewatch ||  || align=right data-sort-value="0.87" | 870 m || 
|}

603401–603500 

|-bgcolor=#fefefe
| 603401 ||  || — || November 19, 2009 || Kitt Peak || Spacewatch || H || align=right | 1.0 km || 
|-id=402 bgcolor=#fefefe
| 603402 ||  || — || February 29, 2008 || Kitt Peak || Spacewatch ||  || align=right data-sort-value="0.74" | 740 m || 
|-id=403 bgcolor=#fefefe
| 603403 ||  || — || February 10, 2015 || Mount Lemmon || Mount Lemmon Survey ||  || align=right data-sort-value="0.64" | 640 m || 
|-id=404 bgcolor=#fefefe
| 603404 ||  || — || April 21, 2009 || Mount Lemmon || Mount Lemmon Survey ||  || align=right data-sort-value="0.68" | 680 m || 
|-id=405 bgcolor=#fefefe
| 603405 ||  || — || January 22, 2015 || Haleakala || Pan-STARRS ||  || align=right data-sort-value="0.54" | 540 m || 
|-id=406 bgcolor=#d6d6d6
| 603406 ||  || — || February 11, 2015 || Mount Lemmon || Mount Lemmon Survey ||  || align=right | 2.2 km || 
|-id=407 bgcolor=#E9E9E9
| 603407 ||  || — || June 8, 2011 || Nogales || M. Schwartz, P. R. Holvorcem ||  || align=right | 1.9 km || 
|-id=408 bgcolor=#E9E9E9
| 603408 ||  || — || January 26, 1998 || Kitt Peak || Spacewatch ||  || align=right data-sort-value="0.99" | 990 m || 
|-id=409 bgcolor=#fefefe
| 603409 ||  || — || August 19, 2006 || Kitt Peak || Spacewatch ||  || align=right data-sort-value="0.70" | 700 m || 
|-id=410 bgcolor=#d6d6d6
| 603410 ||  || — || January 16, 2015 || Haleakala || Pan-STARRS ||  || align=right | 2.5 km || 
|-id=411 bgcolor=#fefefe
| 603411 ||  || — || February 28, 2008 || Kitt Peak || Spacewatch ||  || align=right data-sort-value="0.51" | 510 m || 
|-id=412 bgcolor=#fefefe
| 603412 ||  || — || November 8, 2010 || Mount Lemmon || Mount Lemmon Survey ||  || align=right data-sort-value="0.77" | 770 m || 
|-id=413 bgcolor=#E9E9E9
| 603413 ||  || — || January 8, 2006 || Mount Lemmon || Mount Lemmon Survey ||  || align=right | 2.2 km || 
|-id=414 bgcolor=#fefefe
| 603414 ||  || — || May 14, 2008 || Mount Lemmon || Mount Lemmon Survey ||  || align=right data-sort-value="0.87" | 870 m || 
|-id=415 bgcolor=#d6d6d6
| 603415 ||  || — || January 27, 2015 || Haleakala || Pan-STARRS ||  || align=right | 1.9 km || 
|-id=416 bgcolor=#E9E9E9
| 603416 ||  || — || September 4, 2008 || Kitt Peak || Spacewatch ||  || align=right | 2.0 km || 
|-id=417 bgcolor=#E9E9E9
| 603417 ||  || — || March 11, 2007 || Kitt Peak || Spacewatch ||  || align=right data-sort-value="0.75" | 750 m || 
|-id=418 bgcolor=#E9E9E9
| 603418 ||  || — || November 4, 2005 || Mount Lemmon || Mount Lemmon Survey ||  || align=right data-sort-value="0.98" | 980 m || 
|-id=419 bgcolor=#d6d6d6
| 603419 ||  || — || January 29, 2015 || Haleakala || Pan-STARRS ||  || align=right | 2.5 km || 
|-id=420 bgcolor=#E9E9E9
| 603420 ||  || — || April 29, 2003 || Kitt Peak || Spacewatch ||  || align=right data-sort-value="0.94" | 940 m || 
|-id=421 bgcolor=#fefefe
| 603421 ||  || — || September 26, 2006 || Catalina || CSS ||  || align=right data-sort-value="0.82" | 820 m || 
|-id=422 bgcolor=#fefefe
| 603422 ||  || — || December 13, 2006 || Kitt Peak || Spacewatch ||  || align=right data-sort-value="0.51" | 510 m || 
|-id=423 bgcolor=#fefefe
| 603423 ||  || — || September 11, 2010 || Kitt Peak || Spacewatch ||  || align=right data-sort-value="0.68" | 680 m || 
|-id=424 bgcolor=#fefefe
| 603424 ||  || — || March 6, 2008 || Mount Lemmon || Mount Lemmon Survey ||  || align=right data-sort-value="0.72" | 720 m || 
|-id=425 bgcolor=#E9E9E9
| 603425 ||  || — || October 17, 2009 || Mount Lemmon || Mount Lemmon Survey ||  || align=right data-sort-value="0.70" | 700 m || 
|-id=426 bgcolor=#E9E9E9
| 603426 ||  || — || September 13, 2004 || Kitt Peak || Spacewatch ||  || align=right data-sort-value="0.96" | 960 m || 
|-id=427 bgcolor=#fefefe
| 603427 ||  || — || October 20, 2006 || Kitt Peak || L. H. Wasserman ||  || align=right data-sort-value="0.83" | 830 m || 
|-id=428 bgcolor=#E9E9E9
| 603428 ||  || — || February 16, 2015 || Haleakala || Pan-STARRS ||  || align=right data-sort-value="0.88" | 880 m || 
|-id=429 bgcolor=#E9E9E9
| 603429 ||  || — || October 16, 2009 || Mount Lemmon || Mount Lemmon Survey ||  || align=right data-sort-value="0.68" | 680 m || 
|-id=430 bgcolor=#E9E9E9
| 603430 ||  || — || July 20, 2012 || Siding Spring || SSS ||  || align=right | 1.5 km || 
|-id=431 bgcolor=#d6d6d6
| 603431 ||  || — || October 8, 2008 || Mount Lemmon || Mount Lemmon Survey ||  || align=right | 2.4 km || 
|-id=432 bgcolor=#fefefe
| 603432 ||  || — || August 26, 2003 || Cerro Tololo || Cerro Tololo Obs. ||  || align=right data-sort-value="0.63" | 630 m || 
|-id=433 bgcolor=#fefefe
| 603433 ||  || — || January 20, 2015 || Haleakala || Pan-STARRS ||  || align=right data-sort-value="0.56" | 560 m || 
|-id=434 bgcolor=#d6d6d6
| 603434 ||  || — || September 10, 2007 || Mount Lemmon || Mount Lemmon Survey ||  || align=right | 1.9 km || 
|-id=435 bgcolor=#E9E9E9
| 603435 ||  || — || March 13, 2011 || Kitt Peak || Spacewatch ||  || align=right | 1.2 km || 
|-id=436 bgcolor=#E9E9E9
| 603436 ||  || — || March 23, 2003 || Apache Point || SDSS Collaboration ||  || align=right | 1.0 km || 
|-id=437 bgcolor=#fefefe
| 603437 ||  || — || April 28, 2012 || Mount Lemmon || Mount Lemmon Survey ||  || align=right data-sort-value="0.58" | 580 m || 
|-id=438 bgcolor=#d6d6d6
| 603438 ||  || — || January 22, 2015 || Haleakala || Pan-STARRS ||  || align=right | 1.7 km || 
|-id=439 bgcolor=#fefefe
| 603439 ||  || — || May 15, 2012 || Haleakala || Pan-STARRS ||  || align=right data-sort-value="0.55" | 550 m || 
|-id=440 bgcolor=#E9E9E9
| 603440 ||  || — || February 25, 2011 || Mount Lemmon || Mount Lemmon Survey ||  || align=right data-sort-value="0.56" | 560 m || 
|-id=441 bgcolor=#E9E9E9
| 603441 ||  || — || February 25, 2007 || Kitt Peak || Spacewatch ||  || align=right data-sort-value="0.55" | 550 m || 
|-id=442 bgcolor=#d6d6d6
| 603442 ||  || — || October 12, 2007 || Mount Lemmon || Mount Lemmon Survey ||  || align=right | 2.8 km || 
|-id=443 bgcolor=#d6d6d6
| 603443 ||  || — || November 2, 2007 || Mount Lemmon || Mount Lemmon Survey ||  || align=right | 2.7 km || 
|-id=444 bgcolor=#E9E9E9
| 603444 ||  || — || February 16, 2015 || Haleakala || Pan-STARRS ||  || align=right | 1.6 km || 
|-id=445 bgcolor=#E9E9E9
| 603445 ||  || — || March 4, 2011 || Kitt Peak || Spacewatch ||  || align=right data-sort-value="0.70" | 700 m || 
|-id=446 bgcolor=#E9E9E9
| 603446 ||  || — || March 10, 2011 || Kitt Peak || Spacewatch ||  || align=right | 1.2 km || 
|-id=447 bgcolor=#fefefe
| 603447 ||  || — || July 4, 2005 || Palomar || NEAT ||  || align=right data-sort-value="0.85" | 850 m || 
|-id=448 bgcolor=#E9E9E9
| 603448 ||  || — || September 3, 2008 || Kitt Peak || Spacewatch ||  || align=right | 1.2 km || 
|-id=449 bgcolor=#fefefe
| 603449 ||  || — || October 23, 2006 || Mount Lemmon || Mount Lemmon Survey ||  || align=right data-sort-value="0.64" | 640 m || 
|-id=450 bgcolor=#fefefe
| 603450 ||  || — || July 8, 2005 || Kitt Peak || Spacewatch ||  || align=right data-sort-value="0.78" | 780 m || 
|-id=451 bgcolor=#E9E9E9
| 603451 ||  || — || January 28, 2007 || Mount Lemmon || Mount Lemmon Survey ||  || align=right data-sort-value="0.81" | 810 m || 
|-id=452 bgcolor=#fefefe
| 603452 ||  || — || November 22, 2006 || Mount Lemmon || Mount Lemmon Survey ||  || align=right data-sort-value="0.64" | 640 m || 
|-id=453 bgcolor=#fefefe
| 603453 ||  || — || February 13, 2004 || Kitt Peak || Spacewatch ||  || align=right data-sort-value="0.67" | 670 m || 
|-id=454 bgcolor=#fefefe
| 603454 ||  || — || April 2, 2009 || Kitt Peak || Spacewatch ||  || align=right data-sort-value="0.44" | 440 m || 
|-id=455 bgcolor=#fefefe
| 603455 ||  || — || February 8, 2011 || Mount Lemmon || Mount Lemmon Survey ||  || align=right data-sort-value="0.58" | 580 m || 
|-id=456 bgcolor=#E9E9E9
| 603456 ||  || — || March 17, 2007 || Kitt Peak || Spacewatch ||  || align=right data-sort-value="0.86" | 860 m || 
|-id=457 bgcolor=#fefefe
| 603457 ||  || — || August 23, 2006 || Palomar || NEAT ||  || align=right data-sort-value="0.80" | 800 m || 
|-id=458 bgcolor=#E9E9E9
| 603458 ||  || — || November 25, 2009 || Kitt Peak || Spacewatch ||  || align=right | 1.3 km || 
|-id=459 bgcolor=#E9E9E9
| 603459 ||  || — || January 27, 2015 || Haleakala || Pan-STARRS ||  || align=right data-sort-value="0.91" | 910 m || 
|-id=460 bgcolor=#E9E9E9
| 603460 ||  || — || January 23, 2015 || Haleakala || Pan-STARRS ||  || align=right data-sort-value="0.86" | 860 m || 
|-id=461 bgcolor=#fefefe
| 603461 ||  || — || November 2, 2010 || Mount Lemmon || Mount Lemmon Survey ||  || align=right data-sort-value="0.72" | 720 m || 
|-id=462 bgcolor=#fefefe
| 603462 ||  || — || August 27, 2006 || Lulin || LUSS ||  || align=right | 1.1 km || 
|-id=463 bgcolor=#fefefe
| 603463 ||  || — || January 19, 2015 || Haleakala || Pan-STARRS ||  || align=right data-sort-value="0.61" | 610 m || 
|-id=464 bgcolor=#E9E9E9
| 603464 ||  || — || February 17, 2015 || Haleakala || Pan-STARRS ||  || align=right | 1.0 km || 
|-id=465 bgcolor=#fefefe
| 603465 ||  || — || November 22, 2006 || Mount Lemmon || Mount Lemmon Survey ||  || align=right data-sort-value="0.57" | 570 m || 
|-id=466 bgcolor=#fefefe
| 603466 ||  || — || January 30, 2011 || Mount Lemmon || Mount Lemmon Survey ||  || align=right data-sort-value="0.98" | 980 m || 
|-id=467 bgcolor=#E9E9E9
| 603467 ||  || — || May 10, 2007 || Mount Lemmon || Mount Lemmon Survey ||  || align=right | 1.5 km || 
|-id=468 bgcolor=#E9E9E9
| 603468 ||  || — || April 8, 2003 || Haleakala || AMOS || MAR || align=right | 1.4 km || 
|-id=469 bgcolor=#E9E9E9
| 603469 ||  || — || January 23, 2006 || Kitt Peak || Spacewatch ||  || align=right | 1.7 km || 
|-id=470 bgcolor=#d6d6d6
| 603470 ||  || — || August 17, 2012 || Haleakala || Pan-STARRS || Tj (2.99) || align=right | 2.5 km || 
|-id=471 bgcolor=#E9E9E9
| 603471 ||  || — || March 26, 2011 || Haleakala || Pan-STARRS ||  || align=right data-sort-value="0.94" | 940 m || 
|-id=472 bgcolor=#E9E9E9
| 603472 ||  || — || November 17, 2009 || Mount Lemmon || Mount Lemmon Survey ||  || align=right | 2.0 km || 
|-id=473 bgcolor=#E9E9E9
| 603473 ||  || — || February 17, 2015 || Haleakala || Pan-STARRS ||  || align=right | 1.4 km || 
|-id=474 bgcolor=#d6d6d6
| 603474 ||  || — || February 17, 2015 || Haleakala || Pan-STARRS ||  || align=right | 2.6 km || 
|-id=475 bgcolor=#fefefe
| 603475 ||  || — || February 17, 2015 || Haleakala || Pan-STARRS ||  || align=right | 1.1 km || 
|-id=476 bgcolor=#E9E9E9
| 603476 ||  || — || February 17, 2015 || Haleakala || Pan-STARRS ||  || align=right | 1.6 km || 
|-id=477 bgcolor=#FA8072
| 603477 ||  || — || December 26, 2014 || Haleakala || Pan-STARRS ||  || align=right data-sort-value="0.68" | 680 m || 
|-id=478 bgcolor=#fefefe
| 603478 ||  || — || March 1, 2012 || Mount Lemmon || Mount Lemmon Survey ||  || align=right data-sort-value="0.73" | 730 m || 
|-id=479 bgcolor=#fefefe
| 603479 ||  || — || February 8, 2008 || Kitt Peak || Spacewatch ||  || align=right data-sort-value="0.55" | 550 m || 
|-id=480 bgcolor=#d6d6d6
| 603480 ||  || — || January 21, 2015 || Haleakala || Pan-STARRS ||  || align=right | 2.0 km || 
|-id=481 bgcolor=#E9E9E9
| 603481 ||  || — || January 10, 2006 || Mount Lemmon || Mount Lemmon Survey ||  || align=right | 2.0 km || 
|-id=482 bgcolor=#E9E9E9
| 603482 ||  || — || March 31, 2011 || Mount Lemmon || Mount Lemmon Survey ||  || align=right | 1.6 km || 
|-id=483 bgcolor=#E9E9E9
| 603483 ||  || — || March 26, 2011 || Kitt Peak || Spacewatch ||  || align=right | 1.5 km || 
|-id=484 bgcolor=#E9E9E9
| 603484 ||  || — || January 26, 2015 || Haleakala || Pan-STARRS ||  || align=right | 1.0 km || 
|-id=485 bgcolor=#E9E9E9
| 603485 ||  || — || January 24, 2015 || Haleakala || Pan-STARRS ||  || align=right | 1.6 km || 
|-id=486 bgcolor=#fefefe
| 603486 ||  || — || December 6, 2010 || Mount Lemmon || Mount Lemmon Survey ||  || align=right data-sort-value="0.72" | 720 m || 
|-id=487 bgcolor=#d6d6d6
| 603487 ||  || — || November 3, 2007 || Mount Lemmon || Mount Lemmon Survey ||  || align=right | 2.6 km || 
|-id=488 bgcolor=#fefefe
| 603488 ||  || — || February 25, 2011 || Mount Lemmon || Mount Lemmon Survey ||  || align=right data-sort-value="0.71" | 710 m || 
|-id=489 bgcolor=#E9E9E9
| 603489 ||  || — || August 13, 2012 || Haleakala || Pan-STARRS ||  || align=right | 1.3 km || 
|-id=490 bgcolor=#E9E9E9
| 603490 ||  || — || January 21, 2015 || Haleakala || Pan-STARRS ||  || align=right | 1.1 km || 
|-id=491 bgcolor=#C2FFFF
| 603491 ||  || — || April 10, 2005 || Kitt Peak || Kitt Peak Obs. || L4 || align=right | 8.2 km || 
|-id=492 bgcolor=#E9E9E9
| 603492 ||  || — || August 24, 2008 || Kitt Peak || Spacewatch ||  || align=right | 2.3 km || 
|-id=493 bgcolor=#fefefe
| 603493 ||  || — || December 20, 2014 || Haleakala || Pan-STARRS ||  || align=right data-sort-value="0.83" | 830 m || 
|-id=494 bgcolor=#fefefe
| 603494 ||  || — || January 21, 2015 || Haleakala || Pan-STARRS ||  || align=right data-sort-value="0.71" | 710 m || 
|-id=495 bgcolor=#E9E9E9
| 603495 ||  || — || January 21, 2015 || Haleakala || Pan-STARRS ||  || align=right data-sort-value="0.98" | 980 m || 
|-id=496 bgcolor=#E9E9E9
| 603496 ||  || — || January 18, 2015 || Haleakala || Pan-STARRS ||  || align=right | 1.3 km || 
|-id=497 bgcolor=#E9E9E9
| 603497 ||  || — || March 26, 2007 || Mount Lemmon || Mount Lemmon Survey ||  || align=right | 1.2 km || 
|-id=498 bgcolor=#E9E9E9
| 603498 ||  || — || October 11, 2004 || Kitt Peak || Spacewatch ||  || align=right | 2.3 km || 
|-id=499 bgcolor=#fefefe
| 603499 ||  || — || January 8, 2011 || Mount Lemmon || Mount Lemmon Survey ||  || align=right data-sort-value="0.83" | 830 m || 
|-id=500 bgcolor=#E9E9E9
| 603500 ||  || — || February 22, 2015 || Haleakala || Pan-STARRS ||  || align=right data-sort-value="0.86" | 860 m || 
|}

603501–603600 

|-bgcolor=#d6d6d6
| 603501 ||  || — || November 20, 2008 || Kitt Peak || Spacewatch || EOS || align=right | 1.4 km || 
|-id=502 bgcolor=#d6d6d6
| 603502 ||  || — || January 23, 2015 || Haleakala || Pan-STARRS ||  || align=right | 3.2 km || 
|-id=503 bgcolor=#E9E9E9
| 603503 ||  || — || February 23, 2015 || Haleakala || Pan-STARRS ||  || align=right | 2.0 km || 
|-id=504 bgcolor=#E9E9E9
| 603504 ||  || — || September 23, 2008 || Mount Lemmon || Mount Lemmon Survey || BRG || align=right | 1.4 km || 
|-id=505 bgcolor=#E9E9E9
| 603505 ||  || — || December 11, 2013 || Haleakala || Pan-STARRS ||  || align=right | 1.8 km || 
|-id=506 bgcolor=#E9E9E9
| 603506 ||  || — || February 23, 2015 || Haleakala || Pan-STARRS ||  || align=right data-sort-value="0.81" | 810 m || 
|-id=507 bgcolor=#E9E9E9
| 603507 ||  || — || November 29, 2005 || Palomar || NEAT ||  || align=right data-sort-value="0.97" | 970 m || 
|-id=508 bgcolor=#fefefe
| 603508 ||  || — || February 23, 2015 || Haleakala || Pan-STARRS || H || align=right data-sort-value="0.53" | 530 m || 
|-id=509 bgcolor=#fefefe
| 603509 ||  || — || November 25, 2009 || Kitt Peak || Spacewatch ||  || align=right data-sort-value="0.95" | 950 m || 
|-id=510 bgcolor=#E9E9E9
| 603510 ||  || — || January 30, 2015 || Haleakala || Pan-STARRS ||  || align=right | 1.2 km || 
|-id=511 bgcolor=#fefefe
| 603511 ||  || — || July 8, 2004 || Kitt Peak || Spacewatch || V || align=right data-sort-value="0.72" | 720 m || 
|-id=512 bgcolor=#E9E9E9
| 603512 ||  || — || January 28, 2015 || Haleakala || Pan-STARRS ||  || align=right | 1.0 km || 
|-id=513 bgcolor=#fefefe
| 603513 ||  || — || January 30, 2011 || Haleakala || Pan-STARRS ||  || align=right data-sort-value="0.57" | 570 m || 
|-id=514 bgcolor=#fefefe
| 603514 ||  || — || April 2, 2005 || Mount Lemmon || Mount Lemmon Survey ||  || align=right data-sort-value="0.47" | 470 m || 
|-id=515 bgcolor=#E9E9E9
| 603515 ||  || — || February 12, 2002 || Socorro || LINEAR ||  || align=right | 1.2 km || 
|-id=516 bgcolor=#C2FFFF
| 603516 ||  || — || February 17, 2015 || Haleakala || Pan-STARRS || L4 || align=right | 8.7 km || 
|-id=517 bgcolor=#E9E9E9
| 603517 ||  || — || September 15, 2007 || Kitt Peak || Spacewatch ||  || align=right | 1.8 km || 
|-id=518 bgcolor=#fefefe
| 603518 ||  || — || February 12, 2011 || Mount Lemmon || Mount Lemmon Survey ||  || align=right data-sort-value="0.66" | 660 m || 
|-id=519 bgcolor=#d6d6d6
| 603519 ||  || — || February 16, 2005 || La Silla || A. Boattini ||  || align=right | 2.1 km || 
|-id=520 bgcolor=#fefefe
| 603520 ||  || — || February 10, 2011 || Mount Lemmon || Mount Lemmon Survey ||  || align=right data-sort-value="0.71" | 710 m || 
|-id=521 bgcolor=#E9E9E9
| 603521 ||  || — || January 28, 2015 || Haleakala || Pan-STARRS ||  || align=right data-sort-value="0.91" | 910 m || 
|-id=522 bgcolor=#fefefe
| 603522 ||  || — || November 16, 2010 || Mount Lemmon || Mount Lemmon Survey ||  || align=right data-sort-value="0.68" | 680 m || 
|-id=523 bgcolor=#FA8072
| 603523 ||  || — || February 23, 2015 || Haleakala || Pan-STARRS || H || align=right data-sort-value="0.59" | 590 m || 
|-id=524 bgcolor=#E9E9E9
| 603524 ||  || — || February 18, 2015 || XuYi || PMO NEO ||  || align=right | 2.0 km || 
|-id=525 bgcolor=#E9E9E9
| 603525 ||  || — || February 16, 2015 || Haleakala || Pan-STARRS ||  || align=right | 1.3 km || 
|-id=526 bgcolor=#E9E9E9
| 603526 ||  || — || October 11, 2012 || Haleakala || Pan-STARRS ||  || align=right | 1.4 km || 
|-id=527 bgcolor=#d6d6d6
| 603527 ||  || — || February 16, 2015 || Haleakala || Pan-STARRS ||  || align=right | 1.6 km || 
|-id=528 bgcolor=#E9E9E9
| 603528 ||  || — || February 20, 2015 || Haleakala || Pan-STARRS ||  || align=right | 1.3 km || 
|-id=529 bgcolor=#E9E9E9
| 603529 ||  || — || February 16, 2015 || Haleakala || Pan-STARRS ||  || align=right data-sort-value="0.75" | 750 m || 
|-id=530 bgcolor=#d6d6d6
| 603530 ||  || — || February 18, 2015 || Kitt Peak || L. H. Wasserman, M. W. Buie ||  || align=right | 1.9 km || 
|-id=531 bgcolor=#d6d6d6
| 603531 ||  || — || February 14, 2010 || Mount Lemmon || Mount Lemmon Survey ||  || align=right | 2.0 km || 
|-id=532 bgcolor=#d6d6d6
| 603532 ||  || — || February 17, 2015 || Haleakala || Pan-STARRS ||  || align=right | 2.1 km || 
|-id=533 bgcolor=#E9E9E9
| 603533 ||  || — || March 28, 2011 || Mount Lemmon || Mount Lemmon Survey ||  || align=right data-sort-value="0.75" | 750 m || 
|-id=534 bgcolor=#E9E9E9
| 603534 ||  || — || May 22, 2003 || Kitt Peak || Spacewatch ||  || align=right | 1.5 km || 
|-id=535 bgcolor=#fefefe
| 603535 ||  || — || January 21, 2015 || Haleakala || Pan-STARRS || H || align=right data-sort-value="0.71" | 710 m || 
|-id=536 bgcolor=#fefefe
| 603536 ||  || — || January 29, 2015 || Haleakala || Pan-STARRS ||  || align=right data-sort-value="0.74" | 740 m || 
|-id=537 bgcolor=#E9E9E9
| 603537 ||  || — || January 21, 2015 || Haleakala || Pan-STARRS ||  || align=right | 1.5 km || 
|-id=538 bgcolor=#fefefe
| 603538 ||  || — || November 8, 2010 || Mount Lemmon || Mount Lemmon Survey ||  || align=right data-sort-value="0.61" | 610 m || 
|-id=539 bgcolor=#fefefe
| 603539 ||  || — || September 17, 2006 || Kitt Peak || Spacewatch ||  || align=right data-sort-value="0.87" | 870 m || 
|-id=540 bgcolor=#E9E9E9
| 603540 ||  || — || March 7, 2003 || Needville || J. Dellinger, W. G. Dillon ||  || align=right data-sort-value="0.65" | 650 m || 
|-id=541 bgcolor=#fefefe
| 603541 ||  || — || December 11, 2006 || Kitt Peak || Spacewatch ||  || align=right data-sort-value="0.83" | 830 m || 
|-id=542 bgcolor=#E9E9E9
| 603542 ||  || — || May 5, 2003 || Kitt Peak || Spacewatch ||  || align=right | 1.3 km || 
|-id=543 bgcolor=#E9E9E9
| 603543 ||  || — || March 26, 2003 || Kitt Peak || Spacewatch ||  || align=right data-sort-value="0.71" | 710 m || 
|-id=544 bgcolor=#fefefe
| 603544 ||  || — || May 12, 2012 || Mount Lemmon || Mount Lemmon Survey ||  || align=right data-sort-value="0.57" | 570 m || 
|-id=545 bgcolor=#d6d6d6
| 603545 ||  || — || February 11, 2015 || Mount Lemmon || Mount Lemmon Survey ||  || align=right | 2.5 km || 
|-id=546 bgcolor=#E9E9E9
| 603546 ||  || — || March 14, 2015 || Haleakala || Pan-STARRS ||  || align=right | 1.4 km || 
|-id=547 bgcolor=#E9E9E9
| 603547 ||  || — || April 27, 2011 || Mount Lemmon || Mount Lemmon Survey ||  || align=right | 1.2 km || 
|-id=548 bgcolor=#E9E9E9
| 603548 ||  || — || February 17, 2015 || Haleakala || Pan-STARRS ||  || align=right | 2.5 km || 
|-id=549 bgcolor=#fefefe
| 603549 ||  || — || January 28, 2007 || Catalina || CSS ||  || align=right data-sort-value="0.87" | 870 m || 
|-id=550 bgcolor=#E9E9E9
| 603550 ||  || — || March 6, 2002 || Socorro || LINEAR ||  || align=right | 1.9 km || 
|-id=551 bgcolor=#fefefe
| 603551 ||  || — || January 22, 2015 || Haleakala || Pan-STARRS ||  || align=right data-sort-value="0.56" | 560 m || 
|-id=552 bgcolor=#fefefe
| 603552 ||  || — || March 28, 2012 || Kitt Peak || Spacewatch ||  || align=right data-sort-value="0.55" | 550 m || 
|-id=553 bgcolor=#fefefe
| 603553 ||  || — || March 28, 2008 || Mount Lemmon || Mount Lemmon Survey ||  || align=right data-sort-value="0.56" | 560 m || 
|-id=554 bgcolor=#E9E9E9
| 603554 ||  || — || September 4, 2008 || Kitt Peak || Spacewatch ||  || align=right | 1.6 km || 
|-id=555 bgcolor=#fefefe
| 603555 ||  || — || October 20, 2003 || Kitt Peak || Spacewatch || H || align=right data-sort-value="0.50" | 500 m || 
|-id=556 bgcolor=#fefefe
| 603556 ||  || — || March 15, 2015 || Haleakala || Pan-STARRS || H || align=right data-sort-value="0.50" | 500 m || 
|-id=557 bgcolor=#d6d6d6
| 603557 ||  || — || March 10, 2015 || Mount Lemmon || Mount Lemmon Survey ||  || align=right | 2.7 km || 
|-id=558 bgcolor=#FA8072
| 603558 ||  || — || March 16, 2015 || Catalina || CSS || H || align=right data-sort-value="0.78" | 780 m || 
|-id=559 bgcolor=#E9E9E9
| 603559 ||  || — || October 26, 2009 || Kitt Peak || Spacewatch ||  || align=right | 1.6 km || 
|-id=560 bgcolor=#fefefe
| 603560 ||  || — || October 30, 2013 || Haleakala || Pan-STARRS ||  || align=right | 1.0 km || 
|-id=561 bgcolor=#E9E9E9
| 603561 ||  || — || April 11, 2002 || Palomar || NEAT ||  || align=right | 1.5 km || 
|-id=562 bgcolor=#E9E9E9
| 603562 ||  || — || December 15, 2009 || Saint-Sulpice || B. Christophe ||  || align=right | 1.4 km || 
|-id=563 bgcolor=#E9E9E9
| 603563 ||  || — || February 18, 2015 || Haleakala || Pan-STARRS ||  || align=right | 1.3 km || 
|-id=564 bgcolor=#E9E9E9
| 603564 ||  || — || November 9, 2013 || Haleakala || Pan-STARRS ||  || align=right | 1.2 km || 
|-id=565 bgcolor=#E9E9E9
| 603565 ||  || — || August 12, 2013 || Haleakala || Pan-STARRS ||  || align=right | 2.1 km || 
|-id=566 bgcolor=#E9E9E9
| 603566 ||  || — || October 29, 2008 || Mount Lemmon || Mount Lemmon Survey ||  || align=right | 1.4 km || 
|-id=567 bgcolor=#fefefe
| 603567 ||  || — || March 29, 2011 || Mount Lemmon || Mount Lemmon Survey ||  || align=right data-sort-value="0.59" | 590 m || 
|-id=568 bgcolor=#fefefe
| 603568 ||  || — || March 10, 2007 || Mount Lemmon || Mount Lemmon Survey ||  || align=right data-sort-value="0.57" | 570 m || 
|-id=569 bgcolor=#E9E9E9
| 603569 ||  || — || May 23, 2011 || Mount Lemmon || Mount Lemmon Survey ||  || align=right data-sort-value="0.75" | 750 m || 
|-id=570 bgcolor=#fefefe
| 603570 ||  || — || October 8, 2005 || Kitt Peak || Spacewatch || H || align=right data-sort-value="0.44" | 440 m || 
|-id=571 bgcolor=#E9E9E9
| 603571 ||  || — || March 10, 2007 || Mount Lemmon || Mount Lemmon Survey ||  || align=right | 1.3 km || 
|-id=572 bgcolor=#fefefe
| 603572 ||  || — || March 4, 2005 || Mount Lemmon || Mount Lemmon Survey ||  || align=right data-sort-value="0.72" | 720 m || 
|-id=573 bgcolor=#fefefe
| 603573 ||  || — || March 30, 2008 || Kitt Peak || Spacewatch ||  || align=right data-sort-value="0.71" | 710 m || 
|-id=574 bgcolor=#fefefe
| 603574 ||  || — || March 16, 2004 || Kitt Peak || Spacewatch ||  || align=right data-sort-value="0.73" | 730 m || 
|-id=575 bgcolor=#fefefe
| 603575 ||  || — || October 29, 2010 || Mount Lemmon || Mount Lemmon Survey ||  || align=right data-sort-value="0.68" | 680 m || 
|-id=576 bgcolor=#E9E9E9
| 603576 ||  || — || November 30, 2014 || Haleakala || Pan-STARRS ||  || align=right | 1.4 km || 
|-id=577 bgcolor=#E9E9E9
| 603577 ||  || — || January 18, 2015 || Haleakala || Pan-STARRS ||  || align=right data-sort-value="0.94" | 940 m || 
|-id=578 bgcolor=#E9E9E9
| 603578 ||  || — || January 31, 2015 || Haleakala || Pan-STARRS ||  || align=right | 1.6 km || 
|-id=579 bgcolor=#E9E9E9
| 603579 ||  || — || January 28, 2015 || Haleakala || Pan-STARRS ||  || align=right data-sort-value="0.81" | 810 m || 
|-id=580 bgcolor=#C2FFFF
| 603580 ||  || — || December 29, 2011 || Mount Lemmon || Mount Lemmon Survey || L4 || align=right | 8.6 km || 
|-id=581 bgcolor=#fefefe
| 603581 ||  || — || April 15, 2008 || Mount Lemmon || Mount Lemmon Survey ||  || align=right data-sort-value="0.81" | 810 m || 
|-id=582 bgcolor=#E9E9E9
| 603582 ||  || — || May 25, 2011 || Mount Lemmon || Mount Lemmon Survey ||  || align=right data-sort-value="0.67" | 670 m || 
|-id=583 bgcolor=#E9E9E9
| 603583 ||  || — || March 13, 2011 || Mount Lemmon || Mount Lemmon Survey ||  || align=right data-sort-value="0.96" | 960 m || 
|-id=584 bgcolor=#C2FFFF
| 603584 ||  || — || October 2, 2008 || Mount Lemmon || Mount Lemmon Survey || L4ERY || align=right | 7.5 km || 
|-id=585 bgcolor=#E9E9E9
| 603585 ||  || — || May 11, 2007 || Mount Lemmon || Mount Lemmon Survey ||  || align=right data-sort-value="0.99" | 990 m || 
|-id=586 bgcolor=#E9E9E9
| 603586 ||  || — || November 4, 2012 || Mount Lemmon || Mount Lemmon Survey ||  || align=right | 1.7 km || 
|-id=587 bgcolor=#E9E9E9
| 603587 ||  || — || March 18, 2015 || Haleakala || Pan-STARRS ||  || align=right | 1.9 km || 
|-id=588 bgcolor=#C2FFFF
| 603588 ||  || — || December 28, 2011 || Mount Lemmon || Mount Lemmon Survey || L4 || align=right | 7.5 km || 
|-id=589 bgcolor=#E9E9E9
| 603589 ||  || — || October 24, 2013 || Mount Lemmon || Mount Lemmon Survey ||  || align=right data-sort-value="0.66" | 660 m || 
|-id=590 bgcolor=#d6d6d6
| 603590 ||  || — || September 30, 2006 || Mount Lemmon || Mount Lemmon Survey ||  || align=right | 3.2 km || 
|-id=591 bgcolor=#fefefe
| 603591 ||  || — || April 23, 2007 || Kitt Peak || Spacewatch || H || align=right data-sort-value="0.47" | 470 m || 
|-id=592 bgcolor=#d6d6d6
| 603592 ||  || — || November 18, 2008 || Kitt Peak || Spacewatch ||  || align=right | 2.0 km || 
|-id=593 bgcolor=#E9E9E9
| 603593 ||  || — || April 1, 2011 || Kitt Peak || Spacewatch ||  || align=right | 1.5 km || 
|-id=594 bgcolor=#d6d6d6
| 603594 ||  || — || August 26, 2012 || Kitt Peak || Spacewatch ||  || align=right | 2.2 km || 
|-id=595 bgcolor=#E9E9E9
| 603595 ||  || — || May 10, 2007 || Mount Lemmon || Mount Lemmon Survey ||  || align=right | 1.4 km || 
|-id=596 bgcolor=#fefefe
| 603596 ||  || — || October 26, 2009 || Mount Lemmon || Mount Lemmon Survey ||  || align=right data-sort-value="0.61" | 610 m || 
|-id=597 bgcolor=#d6d6d6
| 603597 ||  || — || December 31, 2013 || Kitt Peak || Spacewatch ||  || align=right | 2.2 km || 
|-id=598 bgcolor=#d6d6d6
| 603598 ||  || — || October 8, 2012 || Haleakala || Pan-STARRS ||  || align=right | 1.8 km || 
|-id=599 bgcolor=#E9E9E9
| 603599 ||  || — || September 16, 2004 || Kitt Peak || Spacewatch ||  || align=right data-sort-value="0.69" | 690 m || 
|-id=600 bgcolor=#E9E9E9
| 603600 ||  || — || January 23, 2015 || Haleakala || Pan-STARRS ||  || align=right | 1.2 km || 
|}

603601–603700 

|-bgcolor=#d6d6d6
| 603601 ||  || — || November 2, 2007 || Kitt Peak || Spacewatch ||  || align=right | 2.2 km || 
|-id=602 bgcolor=#E9E9E9
| 603602 ||  || — || July 28, 2011 || Andrushivka || P. Kyrylenko ||  || align=right | 1.8 km || 
|-id=603 bgcolor=#E9E9E9
| 603603 ||  || — || October 6, 2008 || Mount Lemmon || Mount Lemmon Survey ||  || align=right | 1.5 km || 
|-id=604 bgcolor=#E9E9E9
| 603604 ||  || — || January 30, 2011 || Haleakala || Pan-STARRS ||  || align=right data-sort-value="0.92" | 920 m || 
|-id=605 bgcolor=#fefefe
| 603605 ||  || — || September 9, 2008 || Mount Lemmon || Mount Lemmon Survey ||  || align=right data-sort-value="0.80" | 800 m || 
|-id=606 bgcolor=#fefefe
| 603606 ||  || — || August 3, 2008 || Siding Spring || SSS || H || align=right data-sort-value="0.70" | 700 m || 
|-id=607 bgcolor=#d6d6d6
| 603607 ||  || — || March 16, 2005 || Catalina || CSS ||  || align=right | 2.7 km || 
|-id=608 bgcolor=#fefefe
| 603608 ||  || — || April 19, 2004 || Kitt Peak || Spacewatch ||  || align=right data-sort-value="0.94" | 940 m || 
|-id=609 bgcolor=#d6d6d6
| 603609 ||  || — || March 18, 2005 || Catalina || CSS ||  || align=right | 2.8 km || 
|-id=610 bgcolor=#fefefe
| 603610 ||  || — || November 15, 2006 || Catalina || CSS ||  || align=right data-sort-value="0.92" | 920 m || 
|-id=611 bgcolor=#fefefe
| 603611 ||  || — || March 31, 2008 || Kitt Peak || Spacewatch ||  || align=right data-sort-value="0.67" | 670 m || 
|-id=612 bgcolor=#d6d6d6
| 603612 ||  || — || April 4, 2005 || Catalina || CSS ||  || align=right | 3.3 km || 
|-id=613 bgcolor=#E9E9E9
| 603613 ||  || — || March 11, 2007 || Mount Lemmon || Mount Lemmon Survey ||  || align=right data-sort-value="0.72" | 720 m || 
|-id=614 bgcolor=#E9E9E9
| 603614 ||  || — || March 6, 2011 || Kitt Peak || Spacewatch ||  || align=right data-sort-value="0.92" | 920 m || 
|-id=615 bgcolor=#d6d6d6
| 603615 ||  || — || April 5, 2005 || Mount Lemmon || Mount Lemmon Survey ||  || align=right | 2.0 km || 
|-id=616 bgcolor=#fefefe
| 603616 ||  || — || April 21, 2004 || Campo Imperatore || CINEOS ||  || align=right data-sort-value="0.66" | 660 m || 
|-id=617 bgcolor=#C2FFFF
| 603617 ||  || — || October 22, 2009 || Mount Lemmon || Mount Lemmon Survey || L4 || align=right | 6.9 km || 
|-id=618 bgcolor=#fefefe
| 603618 ||  || — || August 25, 2012 || Kitt Peak || Spacewatch ||  || align=right data-sort-value="0.65" | 650 m || 
|-id=619 bgcolor=#E9E9E9
| 603619 ||  || — || December 22, 2005 || Kitt Peak || Spacewatch ||  || align=right data-sort-value="0.88" | 880 m || 
|-id=620 bgcolor=#C2FFFF
| 603620 ||  || — || January 10, 2013 || Haleakala || Pan-STARRS || L4 || align=right | 7.5 km || 
|-id=621 bgcolor=#fefefe
| 603621 ||  || — || January 23, 2015 || Haleakala || Pan-STARRS ||  || align=right data-sort-value="0.71" | 710 m || 
|-id=622 bgcolor=#E9E9E9
| 603622 ||  || — || April 21, 2011 || Haleakala || Pan-STARRS || (5) || align=right data-sort-value="0.58" | 580 m || 
|-id=623 bgcolor=#E9E9E9
| 603623 ||  || — || March 21, 2015 || Haleakala || Pan-STARRS ||  || align=right | 1.6 km || 
|-id=624 bgcolor=#E9E9E9
| 603624 ||  || — || August 9, 2011 || Piszkesteto || A. Pál ||  || align=right | 1.4 km || 
|-id=625 bgcolor=#E9E9E9
| 603625 ||  || — || April 20, 2007 || Mount Lemmon || Mount Lemmon Survey ||  || align=right data-sort-value="0.97" | 970 m || 
|-id=626 bgcolor=#E9E9E9
| 603626 ||  || — || September 5, 2008 || Kitt Peak || Spacewatch ||  || align=right data-sort-value="0.98" | 980 m || 
|-id=627 bgcolor=#E9E9E9
| 603627 ||  || — || January 23, 2015 || Haleakala || Pan-STARRS ||  || align=right | 1.3 km || 
|-id=628 bgcolor=#C2FFFF
| 603628 ||  || — || March 21, 2015 || Haleakala || Pan-STARRS || L4 || align=right | 7.1 km || 
|-id=629 bgcolor=#C2FFFF
| 603629 ||  || — || November 11, 2010 || Mount Lemmon || Mount Lemmon Survey || L4 || align=right | 6.7 km || 
|-id=630 bgcolor=#E9E9E9
| 603630 ||  || — || August 21, 2004 || Siding Spring || SSS ||  || align=right | 1.2 km || 
|-id=631 bgcolor=#C2FFFF
| 603631 ||  || — || December 1, 2010 || Mount Lemmon || Mount Lemmon Survey || L4 || align=right | 7.8 km || 
|-id=632 bgcolor=#E9E9E9
| 603632 ||  || — || October 11, 2012 || Mount Lemmon || Mount Lemmon Survey ||  || align=right | 1.1 km || 
|-id=633 bgcolor=#E9E9E9
| 603633 ||  || — || April 30, 2011 || Kitt Peak || Spacewatch ||  || align=right data-sort-value="0.86" | 860 m || 
|-id=634 bgcolor=#fefefe
| 603634 ||  || — || November 22, 2005 || Kitt Peak || Spacewatch ||  || align=right data-sort-value="0.82" | 820 m || 
|-id=635 bgcolor=#C2FFFF
| 603635 ||  || — || April 25, 2004 || Kitt Peak || Spacewatch || L4 || align=right | 6.7 km || 
|-id=636 bgcolor=#C2FFFF
| 603636 ||  || — || January 10, 2013 || Haleakala || Pan-STARRS || L4 || align=right | 6.5 km || 
|-id=637 bgcolor=#d6d6d6
| 603637 ||  || — || January 1, 2009 || Kitt Peak || Spacewatch ||  || align=right | 2.7 km || 
|-id=638 bgcolor=#d6d6d6
| 603638 ||  || — || December 13, 2013 || Nogales || M. Schwartz, P. R. Holvorcem ||  || align=right | 2.6 km || 
|-id=639 bgcolor=#E9E9E9
| 603639 ||  || — || March 21, 2015 || Haleakala || Pan-STARRS ||  || align=right data-sort-value="0.93" | 930 m || 
|-id=640 bgcolor=#E9E9E9
| 603640 ||  || — || January 23, 2015 || Haleakala || Pan-STARRS ||  || align=right | 1.6 km || 
|-id=641 bgcolor=#E9E9E9
| 603641 ||  || — || October 18, 2012 || Haleakala || Pan-STARRS ||  || align=right | 1.7 km || 
|-id=642 bgcolor=#E9E9E9
| 603642 ||  || — || February 16, 2015 || Haleakala || Pan-STARRS ||  || align=right data-sort-value="0.82" | 820 m || 
|-id=643 bgcolor=#fefefe
| 603643 ||  || — || April 14, 2004 || Kitt Peak || Spacewatch ||  || align=right data-sort-value="0.66" | 660 m || 
|-id=644 bgcolor=#E9E9E9
| 603644 ||  || — || January 6, 2010 || Mount Lemmon || Mount Lemmon Survey ||  || align=right | 1.2 km || 
|-id=645 bgcolor=#E9E9E9
| 603645 ||  || — || November 17, 2009 || Mount Lemmon || Mount Lemmon Survey ||  || align=right | 1.5 km || 
|-id=646 bgcolor=#E9E9E9
| 603646 ||  || — || March 22, 2015 || Haleakala || Pan-STARRS ||  || align=right | 1.4 km || 
|-id=647 bgcolor=#fefefe
| 603647 ||  || — || January 10, 2011 || Kitt Peak || Spacewatch ||  || align=right data-sort-value="0.88" | 880 m || 
|-id=648 bgcolor=#E9E9E9
| 603648 ||  || — || March 2, 2011 || Mount Lemmon || Mount Lemmon Survey ||  || align=right | 1.6 km || 
|-id=649 bgcolor=#fefefe
| 603649 ||  || — || January 12, 2011 || Mount Lemmon || Mount Lemmon Survey ||  || align=right data-sort-value="0.87" | 870 m || 
|-id=650 bgcolor=#fefefe
| 603650 ||  || — || February 22, 2015 || Haleakala || Pan-STARRS ||  || align=right data-sort-value="0.83" | 830 m || 
|-id=651 bgcolor=#fefefe
| 603651 ||  || — || February 23, 2015 || Haleakala || Pan-STARRS ||  || align=right data-sort-value="0.67" | 670 m || 
|-id=652 bgcolor=#fefefe
| 603652 ||  || — || January 23, 2015 || Haleakala || Pan-STARRS ||  || align=right data-sort-value="0.55" | 550 m || 
|-id=653 bgcolor=#fefefe
| 603653 ||  || — || August 17, 2009 || Kitt Peak || Spacewatch ||  || align=right data-sort-value="0.85" | 850 m || 
|-id=654 bgcolor=#fefefe
| 603654 ||  || — || March 15, 2008 || Kitt Peak || Spacewatch ||  || align=right data-sort-value="0.80" | 800 m || 
|-id=655 bgcolor=#E9E9E9
| 603655 ||  || — || March 20, 2007 || Kitt Peak || Spacewatch ||  || align=right data-sort-value="0.69" | 690 m || 
|-id=656 bgcolor=#d6d6d6
| 603656 ||  || — || November 13, 2007 || Mount Lemmon || Mount Lemmon Survey ||  || align=right | 2.9 km || 
|-id=657 bgcolor=#E9E9E9
| 603657 ||  || — || June 5, 2011 || Mount Lemmon || Mount Lemmon Survey ||  || align=right | 1.5 km || 
|-id=658 bgcolor=#E9E9E9
| 603658 ||  || — || January 22, 2015 || Haleakala || Pan-STARRS ||  || align=right | 1.4 km || 
|-id=659 bgcolor=#fefefe
| 603659 ||  || — || February 16, 2015 || Haleakala || Pan-STARRS ||  || align=right data-sort-value="0.55" | 550 m || 
|-id=660 bgcolor=#E9E9E9
| 603660 ||  || — || April 7, 2007 || Mount Lemmon || Mount Lemmon Survey ||  || align=right data-sort-value="0.57" | 570 m || 
|-id=661 bgcolor=#E9E9E9
| 603661 ||  || — || May 22, 2011 || Kitt Peak || Spacewatch || EUN || align=right data-sort-value="0.90" | 900 m || 
|-id=662 bgcolor=#E9E9E9
| 603662 ||  || — || September 17, 2013 || Mount Lemmon || Mount Lemmon Survey ||  || align=right data-sort-value="0.74" | 740 m || 
|-id=663 bgcolor=#C2FFFF
| 603663 ||  || — || September 25, 2009 || Kitt Peak || Spacewatch || L4 || align=right | 6.2 km || 
|-id=664 bgcolor=#E9E9E9
| 603664 ||  || — || December 10, 2013 || Mount Lemmon || Mount Lemmon Survey ||  || align=right | 1.2 km || 
|-id=665 bgcolor=#E9E9E9
| 603665 ||  || — || May 1, 2003 || Kitt Peak || Spacewatch ||  || align=right data-sort-value="0.95" | 950 m || 
|-id=666 bgcolor=#E9E9E9
| 603666 ||  || — || January 11, 2010 || Kitt Peak || Spacewatch ||  || align=right | 2.4 km || 
|-id=667 bgcolor=#E9E9E9
| 603667 ||  || — || May 22, 2011 || Mount Lemmon || Mount Lemmon Survey ||  || align=right | 1.6 km || 
|-id=668 bgcolor=#fefefe
| 603668 ||  || — || April 9, 2008 || Kitt Peak || Spacewatch ||  || align=right data-sort-value="0.70" | 700 m || 
|-id=669 bgcolor=#fefefe
| 603669 ||  || — || March 23, 2015 || Haleakala || Pan-STARRS ||  || align=right data-sort-value="0.74" | 740 m || 
|-id=670 bgcolor=#fefefe
| 603670 ||  || — || February 7, 2011 || Mount Lemmon || Mount Lemmon Survey ||  || align=right data-sort-value="0.63" | 630 m || 
|-id=671 bgcolor=#fefefe
| 603671 ||  || — || April 27, 2012 || Haleakala || Pan-STARRS ||  || align=right data-sort-value="0.59" | 590 m || 
|-id=672 bgcolor=#E9E9E9
| 603672 ||  || — || June 4, 2011 || Mount Lemmon || Mount Lemmon Survey ||  || align=right | 1.7 km || 
|-id=673 bgcolor=#fefefe
| 603673 ||  || — || March 23, 2015 || Haleakala || Pan-STARRS ||  || align=right data-sort-value="0.70" | 700 m || 
|-id=674 bgcolor=#E9E9E9
| 603674 ||  || — || March 23, 2015 || Haleakala || Pan-STARRS ||  || align=right | 1.0 km || 
|-id=675 bgcolor=#fefefe
| 603675 ||  || — || November 10, 2013 || Kitt Peak || Spacewatch ||  || align=right data-sort-value="0.71" | 710 m || 
|-id=676 bgcolor=#fefefe
| 603676 ||  || — || January 26, 2011 || Mount Lemmon || Mount Lemmon Survey ||  || align=right data-sort-value="0.62" | 620 m || 
|-id=677 bgcolor=#fefefe
| 603677 ||  || — || April 3, 2008 || Mount Lemmon || Mount Lemmon Survey ||  || align=right data-sort-value="0.85" | 850 m || 
|-id=678 bgcolor=#E9E9E9
| 603678 ||  || — || March 13, 2011 || Kitt Peak || Spacewatch ||  || align=right | 1.5 km || 
|-id=679 bgcolor=#fefefe
| 603679 ||  || — || April 24, 2008 || Mount Lemmon || Mount Lemmon Survey ||  || align=right data-sort-value="0.90" | 900 m || 
|-id=680 bgcolor=#fefefe
| 603680 ||  || — || January 24, 2011 || Mount Lemmon || Mount Lemmon Survey ||  || align=right data-sort-value="0.89" | 890 m || 
|-id=681 bgcolor=#fefefe
| 603681 ||  || — || February 11, 2008 || Mount Lemmon || Mount Lemmon Survey ||  || align=right data-sort-value="0.72" | 720 m || 
|-id=682 bgcolor=#fefefe
| 603682 ||  || — || February 16, 2015 || Haleakala || Pan-STARRS ||  || align=right data-sort-value="0.54" | 540 m || 
|-id=683 bgcolor=#E9E9E9
| 603683 ||  || — || March 11, 2015 || Mount Lemmon || Mount Lemmon Survey ||  || align=right data-sort-value="0.94" | 940 m || 
|-id=684 bgcolor=#d6d6d6
| 603684 ||  || — || November 25, 2005 || Mount Lemmon || Mount Lemmon Survey || 3:2 || align=right | 3.5 km || 
|-id=685 bgcolor=#fefefe
| 603685 ||  || — || October 24, 2013 || Kitt Peak || Spacewatch ||  || align=right data-sort-value="0.80" | 800 m || 
|-id=686 bgcolor=#fefefe
| 603686 ||  || — || April 27, 2012 || Mount Lemmon || Mount Lemmon Survey ||  || align=right data-sort-value="0.68" | 680 m || 
|-id=687 bgcolor=#E9E9E9
| 603687 ||  || — || April 20, 2007 || Mount Lemmon || Mount Lemmon Survey ||  || align=right | 1.00 km || 
|-id=688 bgcolor=#fefefe
| 603688 ||  || — || October 2, 2013 || Haleakala || Pan-STARRS ||  || align=right data-sort-value="0.76" | 760 m || 
|-id=689 bgcolor=#fefefe
| 603689 ||  || — || June 17, 2005 || Mount Lemmon || Mount Lemmon Survey ||  || align=right data-sort-value="0.95" | 950 m || 
|-id=690 bgcolor=#fefefe
| 603690 ||  || — || February 8, 2008 || Mount Lemmon || Mount Lemmon Survey ||  || align=right data-sort-value="0.65" | 650 m || 
|-id=691 bgcolor=#fefefe
| 603691 ||  || — || September 19, 1998 || Apache Point || SDSS Collaboration ||  || align=right data-sort-value="0.89" | 890 m || 
|-id=692 bgcolor=#fefefe
| 603692 ||  || — || January 19, 2015 || Haleakala || Pan-STARRS ||  || align=right data-sort-value="0.57" | 570 m || 
|-id=693 bgcolor=#d6d6d6
| 603693 ||  || — || January 25, 2014 || Haleakala || Pan-STARRS ||  || align=right | 2.6 km || 
|-id=694 bgcolor=#fefefe
| 603694 ||  || — || March 25, 2015 || Haleakala || Pan-STARRS ||  || align=right data-sort-value="0.81" | 810 m || 
|-id=695 bgcolor=#fefefe
| 603695 ||  || — || January 28, 2015 || Haleakala || Pan-STARRS ||  || align=right data-sort-value="0.89" | 890 m || 
|-id=696 bgcolor=#E9E9E9
| 603696 ||  || — || February 23, 2015 || Haleakala || Pan-STARRS ||  || align=right | 1.2 km || 
|-id=697 bgcolor=#E9E9E9
| 603697 ||  || — || October 8, 2012 || Haleakala || Pan-STARRS ||  || align=right | 1.4 km || 
|-id=698 bgcolor=#fefefe
| 603698 ||  || — || March 9, 2011 || Kitt Peak || Spacewatch ||  || align=right data-sort-value="0.85" | 850 m || 
|-id=699 bgcolor=#E9E9E9
| 603699 ||  || — || March 13, 2010 || Kitt Peak || Spacewatch ||  || align=right | 2.0 km || 
|-id=700 bgcolor=#E9E9E9
| 603700 ||  || — || April 30, 2011 || Haleakala || Pan-STARRS ||  || align=right data-sort-value="0.96" | 960 m || 
|}

603701–603800 

|-bgcolor=#E9E9E9
| 603701 ||  || — || March 28, 2015 || Haleakala || Pan-STARRS ||  || align=right | 1.1 km || 
|-id=702 bgcolor=#E9E9E9
| 603702 ||  || — || March 28, 2015 || Haleakala || Pan-STARRS ||  || align=right | 1.3 km || 
|-id=703 bgcolor=#E9E9E9
| 603703 ||  || — || March 28, 2015 || Haleakala || Pan-STARRS ||  || align=right data-sort-value="0.97" | 970 m || 
|-id=704 bgcolor=#E9E9E9
| 603704 ||  || — || March 28, 2015 || Haleakala || Pan-STARRS ||  || align=right | 1.8 km || 
|-id=705 bgcolor=#fefefe
| 603705 ||  || — || March 28, 2015 || Haleakala || Pan-STARRS ||  || align=right data-sort-value="0.87" | 870 m || 
|-id=706 bgcolor=#d6d6d6
| 603706 ||  || — || March 28, 2015 || Haleakala || Pan-STARRS ||  || align=right | 3.2 km || 
|-id=707 bgcolor=#E9E9E9
| 603707 ||  || — || September 3, 2007 || Catalina || CSS ||  || align=right | 2.0 km || 
|-id=708 bgcolor=#E9E9E9
| 603708 ||  || — || March 28, 2015 || Haleakala || Pan-STARRS ||  || align=right | 1.5 km || 
|-id=709 bgcolor=#C2FFFF
| 603709 ||  || — || November 30, 2011 || Mount Lemmon || Mount Lemmon Survey || L4 || align=right | 6.8 km || 
|-id=710 bgcolor=#E9E9E9
| 603710 ||  || — || December 4, 2005 || Kitt Peak || Spacewatch ||  || align=right data-sort-value="0.72" | 720 m || 
|-id=711 bgcolor=#E9E9E9
| 603711 ||  || — || March 25, 2015 || Haleakala || Pan-STARRS ||  || align=right | 1.3 km || 
|-id=712 bgcolor=#E9E9E9
| 603712 ||  || — || January 25, 2015 || Haleakala || Pan-STARRS ||  || align=right | 1.7 km || 
|-id=713 bgcolor=#fefefe
| 603713 ||  || — || March 28, 2008 || Kitt Peak || Spacewatch ||  || align=right data-sort-value="0.88" | 880 m || 
|-id=714 bgcolor=#E9E9E9
| 603714 ||  || — || August 7, 2008 || Kitt Peak || Spacewatch ||  || align=right | 1.1 km || 
|-id=715 bgcolor=#fefefe
| 603715 ||  || — || March 2, 2011 || Kitt Peak || Spacewatch ||  || align=right data-sort-value="0.68" | 680 m || 
|-id=716 bgcolor=#fefefe
| 603716 ||  || — || January 23, 2015 || Haleakala || Pan-STARRS ||  || align=right data-sort-value="0.68" | 680 m || 
|-id=717 bgcolor=#fefefe
| 603717 ||  || — || March 25, 2015 || Haleakala || Pan-STARRS ||  || align=right data-sort-value="0.88" | 880 m || 
|-id=718 bgcolor=#E9E9E9
| 603718 ||  || — || March 22, 2015 || Kitt Peak || Spacewatch ||  || align=right data-sort-value="0.87" | 870 m || 
|-id=719 bgcolor=#E9E9E9
| 603719 ||  || — || January 25, 2015 || Haleakala || Pan-STARRS ||  || align=right | 1.7 km || 
|-id=720 bgcolor=#d6d6d6
| 603720 ||  || — || December 22, 2008 || Kitt Peak || Spacewatch ||  || align=right | 1.8 km || 
|-id=721 bgcolor=#E9E9E9
| 603721 ||  || — || September 26, 2003 || Apache Point || SDSS Collaboration ||  || align=right | 2.4 km || 
|-id=722 bgcolor=#d6d6d6
| 603722 ||  || — || December 1, 2008 || Mount Lemmon || Mount Lemmon Survey ||  || align=right | 2.6 km || 
|-id=723 bgcolor=#fefefe
| 603723 ||  || — || March 25, 2015 || Haleakala || Pan-STARRS ||  || align=right data-sort-value="0.65" | 650 m || 
|-id=724 bgcolor=#E9E9E9
| 603724 ||  || — || January 23, 2015 || Haleakala || Pan-STARRS ||  || align=right | 1.2 km || 
|-id=725 bgcolor=#fefefe
| 603725 ||  || — || August 25, 2012 || Haleakala || Pan-STARRS ||  || align=right data-sort-value="0.72" | 720 m || 
|-id=726 bgcolor=#E9E9E9
| 603726 ||  || — || October 8, 2012 || Haleakala || Pan-STARRS ||  || align=right | 2.4 km || 
|-id=727 bgcolor=#fefefe
| 603727 ||  || — || November 10, 2009 || Kitt Peak || Spacewatch ||  || align=right data-sort-value="0.84" | 840 m || 
|-id=728 bgcolor=#E9E9E9
| 603728 ||  || — || October 24, 2003 || Kitt Peak || L. H. Wasserman, D. E. Trilling || ADE || align=right | 1.7 km || 
|-id=729 bgcolor=#E9E9E9
| 603729 ||  || — || December 3, 2005 || Mauna Kea || Mauna Kea Obs. ||  || align=right | 1.0 km || 
|-id=730 bgcolor=#E9E9E9
| 603730 ||  || — || October 23, 2012 || Mount Lemmon || Mount Lemmon Survey ||  || align=right | 1.0 km || 
|-id=731 bgcolor=#E9E9E9
| 603731 ||  || — || March 30, 2015 || Haleakala || Pan-STARRS ||  || align=right data-sort-value="0.74" | 740 m || 
|-id=732 bgcolor=#E9E9E9
| 603732 ||  || — || September 19, 2003 || Anderson Mesa || LONEOS ||  || align=right data-sort-value="0.73" | 730 m || 
|-id=733 bgcolor=#E9E9E9
| 603733 ||  || — || January 24, 2015 || Haleakala || Pan-STARRS ||  || align=right | 1.4 km || 
|-id=734 bgcolor=#E9E9E9
| 603734 ||  || — || September 26, 2008 || Bergisch Gladbach || W. Bickel ||  || align=right | 1.8 km || 
|-id=735 bgcolor=#fefefe
| 603735 ||  || — || May 28, 2008 || Mount Lemmon || Mount Lemmon Survey ||  || align=right data-sort-value="0.89" | 890 m || 
|-id=736 bgcolor=#E9E9E9
| 603736 ||  || — || April 5, 2011 || Mount Lemmon || Mount Lemmon Survey ||  || align=right | 1.1 km || 
|-id=737 bgcolor=#E9E9E9
| 603737 ||  || — || January 24, 2015 || Haleakala || Pan-STARRS ||  || align=right | 1.5 km || 
|-id=738 bgcolor=#d6d6d6
| 603738 ||  || — || March 9, 2005 || Mount Lemmon || Mount Lemmon Survey ||  || align=right | 3.2 km || 
|-id=739 bgcolor=#E9E9E9
| 603739 ||  || — || November 28, 2013 || Mount Lemmon || Mount Lemmon Survey ||  || align=right data-sort-value="0.96" | 960 m || 
|-id=740 bgcolor=#C2FFFF
| 603740 ||  || — || January 18, 2013 || Haleakala || Pan-STARRS || L4 || align=right | 8.7 km || 
|-id=741 bgcolor=#E9E9E9
| 603741 ||  || — || March 16, 2015 || Haleakala || Pan-STARRS ||  || align=right | 1.1 km || 
|-id=742 bgcolor=#C2FFFF
| 603742 ||  || — || March 31, 2003 || Apache Point || SDSS Collaboration || L4 || align=right | 8.3 km || 
|-id=743 bgcolor=#C2FFFF
| 603743 ||  || — || December 29, 2011 || Mount Lemmon || Mount Lemmon Survey || L4ERY || align=right | 7.1 km || 
|-id=744 bgcolor=#fefefe
| 603744 ||  || — || March 17, 2015 || Haleakala || Pan-STARRS ||  || align=right data-sort-value="0.72" | 720 m || 
|-id=745 bgcolor=#C2FFFF
| 603745 ||  || — || October 14, 2009 || Mount Lemmon || Mount Lemmon Survey || L4 || align=right | 7.2 km || 
|-id=746 bgcolor=#d6d6d6
| 603746 ||  || — || March 26, 2004 || Kitt Peak || Spacewatch ||  || align=right | 2.8 km || 
|-id=747 bgcolor=#C2FFFF
| 603747 ||  || — || October 6, 2008 || Mount Lemmon || Mount Lemmon Survey || L4 || align=right | 7.0 km || 
|-id=748 bgcolor=#E9E9E9
| 603748 ||  || — || November 27, 2013 || Haleakala || Pan-STARRS ||  || align=right data-sort-value="0.71" | 710 m || 
|-id=749 bgcolor=#E9E9E9
| 603749 ||  || — || March 17, 2015 || Haleakala || Pan-STARRS ||  || align=right data-sort-value="0.70" | 700 m || 
|-id=750 bgcolor=#d6d6d6
| 603750 ||  || — || October 1, 2013 || Kitt Peak || Spacewatch ||  || align=right | 1.8 km || 
|-id=751 bgcolor=#d6d6d6
| 603751 ||  || — || January 20, 2009 || Kitt Peak || Spacewatch ||  || align=right | 1.9 km || 
|-id=752 bgcolor=#fefefe
| 603752 ||  || — || September 18, 2003 || Kitt Peak || Spacewatch || H || align=right data-sort-value="0.45" | 450 m || 
|-id=753 bgcolor=#E9E9E9
| 603753 ||  || — || June 5, 2011 || Mount Lemmon || Mount Lemmon Survey ||  || align=right | 1.5 km || 
|-id=754 bgcolor=#d6d6d6
| 603754 ||  || — || October 11, 2006 || Palomar || NEAT ||  || align=right | 3.3 km || 
|-id=755 bgcolor=#fefefe
| 603755 ||  || — || February 17, 2004 || Kitt Peak || Spacewatch ||  || align=right data-sort-value="0.54" | 540 m || 
|-id=756 bgcolor=#E9E9E9
| 603756 ||  || — || March 18, 2015 || Haleakala || Pan-STARRS ||  || align=right data-sort-value="0.90" | 900 m || 
|-id=757 bgcolor=#d6d6d6
| 603757 ||  || — || September 14, 2006 || Kitt Peak || Spacewatch ||  || align=right | 2.6 km || 
|-id=758 bgcolor=#d6d6d6
| 603758 ||  || — || February 22, 2004 || Kitt Peak || Spacewatch ||  || align=right | 2.2 km || 
|-id=759 bgcolor=#fefefe
| 603759 ||  || — || March 18, 2015 || Haleakala || Pan-STARRS || H || align=right data-sort-value="0.56" | 560 m || 
|-id=760 bgcolor=#d6d6d6
| 603760 ||  || — || January 11, 2010 || Kitt Peak || Spacewatch ||  || align=right | 2.0 km || 
|-id=761 bgcolor=#d6d6d6
| 603761 ||  || — || February 25, 2015 || Haleakala || Pan-STARRS ||  || align=right | 2.4 km || 
|-id=762 bgcolor=#d6d6d6
| 603762 ||  || — || February 25, 2015 || Haleakala || Pan-STARRS ||  || align=right | 2.1 km || 
|-id=763 bgcolor=#C2FFFF
| 603763 ||  || — || October 29, 2010 || Mount Lemmon || Mount Lemmon Survey || L4 || align=right | 8.2 km || 
|-id=764 bgcolor=#E9E9E9
| 603764 ||  || — || March 20, 2015 || Haleakala || Pan-STARRS ||  || align=right data-sort-value="0.77" | 770 m || 
|-id=765 bgcolor=#C2FFFF
| 603765 ||  || — || October 15, 2009 || Mount Lemmon || Mount Lemmon Survey || L4 || align=right | 8.3 km || 
|-id=766 bgcolor=#fefefe
| 603766 ||  || — || March 30, 2015 || Haleakala || Pan-STARRS || H || align=right data-sort-value="0.63" | 630 m || 
|-id=767 bgcolor=#C2FFFF
| 603767 ||  || — || March 24, 2015 || Haleakala || Pan-STARRS || L4 || align=right | 6.5 km || 
|-id=768 bgcolor=#C2FFFF
| 603768 ||  || — || October 17, 2009 || Mount Lemmon || Mount Lemmon Survey || L4 || align=right | 7.8 km || 
|-id=769 bgcolor=#fefefe
| 603769 ||  || — || September 9, 2008 || Mount Lemmon || Mount Lemmon Survey || H || align=right data-sort-value="0.64" | 640 m || 
|-id=770 bgcolor=#E9E9E9
| 603770 ||  || — || March 31, 2015 || Haleakala || Pan-STARRS ||  || align=right | 1.7 km || 
|-id=771 bgcolor=#E9E9E9
| 603771 ||  || — || March 21, 2015 || Haleakala || Pan-STARRS ||  || align=right | 1.8 km || 
|-id=772 bgcolor=#E9E9E9
| 603772 ||  || — || January 23, 2015 || Haleakala || Pan-STARRS ||  || align=right | 1.4 km || 
|-id=773 bgcolor=#E9E9E9
| 603773 ||  || — || March 22, 2015 || Kitt Peak || Spacewatch ||  || align=right | 1.5 km || 
|-id=774 bgcolor=#E9E9E9
| 603774 ||  || — || August 22, 2004 || Kitt Peak || Spacewatch ||  || align=right data-sort-value="0.76" | 760 m || 
|-id=775 bgcolor=#E9E9E9
| 603775 ||  || — || March 22, 2015 || Haleakala || Pan-STARRS ||  || align=right | 1.6 km || 
|-id=776 bgcolor=#fefefe
| 603776 ||  || — || October 11, 2005 || Kitt Peak || Spacewatch ||  || align=right data-sort-value="0.59" | 590 m || 
|-id=777 bgcolor=#d6d6d6
| 603777 ||  || — || January 24, 2014 || Haleakala || Pan-STARRS ||  || align=right | 1.9 km || 
|-id=778 bgcolor=#E9E9E9
| 603778 ||  || — || January 3, 2014 || Mount Lemmon || Mount Lemmon Survey ||  || align=right | 1.2 km || 
|-id=779 bgcolor=#E9E9E9
| 603779 ||  || — || November 6, 2012 || Mount Lemmon || Mount Lemmon Survey ||  || align=right | 1.5 km || 
|-id=780 bgcolor=#fefefe
| 603780 ||  || — || April 26, 2011 || Mount Lemmon || Mount Lemmon Survey ||  || align=right data-sort-value="0.68" | 680 m || 
|-id=781 bgcolor=#d6d6d6
| 603781 ||  || — || March 31, 2015 || Haleakala || Pan-STARRS ||  || align=right | 2.3 km || 
|-id=782 bgcolor=#E9E9E9
| 603782 ||  || — || March 25, 2015 || Haleakala || Pan-STARRS ||  || align=right | 1.2 km || 
|-id=783 bgcolor=#E9E9E9
| 603783 ||  || — || March 18, 2015 || Haleakala || Pan-STARRS ||  || align=right | 1.1 km || 
|-id=784 bgcolor=#E9E9E9
| 603784 ||  || — || March 28, 2015 || Haleakala || Pan-STARRS ||  || align=right | 1.2 km || 
|-id=785 bgcolor=#E9E9E9
| 603785 ||  || — || March 30, 2015 || Haleakala || Pan-STARRS ||  || align=right data-sort-value="0.75" | 750 m || 
|-id=786 bgcolor=#E9E9E9
| 603786 ||  || — || March 19, 2015 || Haleakala || Pan-STARRS ||  || align=right | 1.3 km || 
|-id=787 bgcolor=#C2FFFF
| 603787 ||  || — || March 29, 2015 || Haleakala || Pan-STARRS || L4 || align=right | 7.6 km || 
|-id=788 bgcolor=#E9E9E9
| 603788 ||  || — || March 24, 2015 || Mount Lemmon || Mount Lemmon Survey ||  || align=right | 2.0 km || 
|-id=789 bgcolor=#E9E9E9
| 603789 ||  || — || March 22, 2015 || Haleakala || Pan-STARRS ||  || align=right data-sort-value="0.95" | 950 m || 
|-id=790 bgcolor=#E9E9E9
| 603790 ||  || — || March 28, 2015 || Haleakala || Pan-STARRS ||  || align=right | 1.1 km || 
|-id=791 bgcolor=#fefefe
| 603791 ||  || — || March 22, 2015 || Mount Lemmon || Mount Lemmon Survey ||  || align=right data-sort-value="0.65" | 650 m || 
|-id=792 bgcolor=#E9E9E9
| 603792 ||  || — || March 21, 2015 || Haleakala || Pan-STARRS ||  || align=right | 1.1 km || 
|-id=793 bgcolor=#fefefe
| 603793 ||  || — || March 24, 2015 || Haleakala || Pan-STARRS ||  || align=right data-sort-value="0.60" | 600 m || 
|-id=794 bgcolor=#E9E9E9
| 603794 ||  || — || January 27, 2006 || Mount Lemmon || Mount Lemmon Survey ||  || align=right | 1.2 km || 
|-id=795 bgcolor=#d6d6d6
| 603795 ||  || — || March 19, 2015 || Haleakala || Pan-STARRS ||  || align=right | 2.7 km || 
|-id=796 bgcolor=#d6d6d6
| 603796 ||  || — || December 30, 2008 || Kitt Peak || Spacewatch ||  || align=right | 2.0 km || 
|-id=797 bgcolor=#d6d6d6
| 603797 ||  || — || March 17, 2015 || Haleakala || Pan-STARRS ||  || align=right | 2.0 km || 
|-id=798 bgcolor=#d6d6d6
| 603798 ||  || — || March 20, 2015 || Haleakala || Pan-STARRS ||  || align=right | 2.0 km || 
|-id=799 bgcolor=#fefefe
| 603799 ||  || — || March 31, 2015 || Haleakala || Pan-STARRS || H || align=right data-sort-value="0.46" | 460 m || 
|-id=800 bgcolor=#E9E9E9
| 603800 ||  || — || March 30, 2015 || Haleakala || Pan-STARRS ||  || align=right | 1.6 km || 
|}

603801–603900 

|-bgcolor=#fefefe
| 603801 ||  || — || November 28, 2006 || Mount Lemmon || Mount Lemmon Survey ||  || align=right data-sort-value="0.98" | 980 m || 
|-id=802 bgcolor=#d6d6d6
| 603802 ||  || — || March 16, 2015 || Haleakala || Pan-STARRS ||  || align=right | 2.5 km || 
|-id=803 bgcolor=#E9E9E9
| 603803 ||  || — || April 13, 2011 || Mount Lemmon || Mount Lemmon Survey ||  || align=right | 1.2 km || 
|-id=804 bgcolor=#E9E9E9
| 603804 ||  || — || May 6, 2011 || Mount Lemmon || Mount Lemmon Survey ||  || align=right | 1.2 km || 
|-id=805 bgcolor=#E9E9E9
| 603805 ||  || — || August 21, 2004 || Siding Spring || SSS ||  || align=right | 1.1 km || 
|-id=806 bgcolor=#E9E9E9
| 603806 ||  || — || May 23, 2011 || Nogales || M. Schwartz, P. R. Holvorcem ||  || align=right | 1.4 km || 
|-id=807 bgcolor=#E9E9E9
| 603807 ||  || — || December 19, 2009 || Kitt Peak || Spacewatch ||  || align=right | 1.3 km || 
|-id=808 bgcolor=#E9E9E9
| 603808 ||  || — || February 18, 2015 || Haleakala || Pan-STARRS ||  || align=right data-sort-value="0.75" | 750 m || 
|-id=809 bgcolor=#fefefe
| 603809 ||  || — || December 25, 2011 || Kitt Peak || Spacewatch || H || align=right data-sort-value="0.75" | 750 m || 
|-id=810 bgcolor=#fefefe
| 603810 ||  || — || March 29, 2015 || Mount Lemmon || Mount Lemmon Survey || H || align=right data-sort-value="0.62" | 620 m || 
|-id=811 bgcolor=#fefefe
| 603811 ||  || — || February 27, 2015 || Haleakala || Pan-STARRS ||  || align=right data-sort-value="0.57" | 570 m || 
|-id=812 bgcolor=#E9E9E9
| 603812 ||  || — || June 27, 1998 || Kitt Peak || Spacewatch ||  || align=right | 1.1 km || 
|-id=813 bgcolor=#E9E9E9
| 603813 ||  || — || January 7, 2014 || Kitt Peak || Spacewatch ||  || align=right | 1.0 km || 
|-id=814 bgcolor=#d6d6d6
| 603814 ||  || — || December 8, 2012 || Mount Lemmon || Mount Lemmon Survey ||  || align=right | 2.8 km || 
|-id=815 bgcolor=#d6d6d6
| 603815 ||  || — || February 16, 2015 || Haleakala || Pan-STARRS ||  || align=right | 2.4 km || 
|-id=816 bgcolor=#E9E9E9
| 603816 ||  || — || May 22, 2011 || Mount Lemmon || Mount Lemmon Survey ||  || align=right | 1.2 km || 
|-id=817 bgcolor=#E9E9E9
| 603817 ||  || — || October 26, 2013 || Mount Lemmon || Mount Lemmon Survey ||  || align=right | 1.5 km || 
|-id=818 bgcolor=#fefefe
| 603818 ||  || — || January 30, 2011 || Haleakala || Pan-STARRS ||  || align=right data-sort-value="0.62" | 620 m || 
|-id=819 bgcolor=#C2FFFF
| 603819 ||  || — || January 20, 2013 || Kitt Peak || Spacewatch || L4 || align=right | 7.3 km || 
|-id=820 bgcolor=#fefefe
| 603820 ||  || — || January 17, 2007 || Kitt Peak || Spacewatch ||  || align=right data-sort-value="0.72" | 720 m || 
|-id=821 bgcolor=#fefefe
| 603821 ||  || — || March 9, 2011 || Mount Lemmon || Mount Lemmon Survey ||  || align=right data-sort-value="0.58" | 580 m || 
|-id=822 bgcolor=#E9E9E9
| 603822 ||  || — || April 14, 2015 || Mount Lemmon || Mount Lemmon Survey ||  || align=right data-sort-value="0.76" | 760 m || 
|-id=823 bgcolor=#E9E9E9
| 603823 ||  || — || May 22, 2011 || Mount Lemmon || Mount Lemmon Survey ||  || align=right | 1.1 km || 
|-id=824 bgcolor=#E9E9E9
| 603824 ||  || — || June 4, 2011 || Mount Lemmon || Mount Lemmon Survey ||  || align=right | 1.3 km || 
|-id=825 bgcolor=#E9E9E9
| 603825 ||  || — || May 22, 2011 || Mount Lemmon || Mount Lemmon Survey ||  || align=right | 1.3 km || 
|-id=826 bgcolor=#E9E9E9
| 603826 ||  || — || January 23, 2015 || Haleakala || Pan-STARRS ||  || align=right data-sort-value="0.95" | 950 m || 
|-id=827 bgcolor=#E9E9E9
| 603827 ||  || — || September 24, 2008 || Kitt Peak || Spacewatch ||  || align=right | 1.5 km || 
|-id=828 bgcolor=#C2FFFF
| 603828 ||  || — || February 13, 2002 || Apache Point || SDSS Collaboration || L4 || align=right | 7.7 km || 
|-id=829 bgcolor=#fefefe
| 603829 ||  || — || May 15, 2008 || Kitt Peak || Spacewatch ||  || align=right data-sort-value="0.75" | 750 m || 
|-id=830 bgcolor=#fefefe
| 603830 ||  || — || April 10, 2015 || Haleakala || Pan-STARRS || H || align=right data-sort-value="0.57" | 570 m || 
|-id=831 bgcolor=#E9E9E9
| 603831 ||  || — || September 18, 2007 || Mount Lemmon || Mount Lemmon Survey ||  || align=right | 1.0 km || 
|-id=832 bgcolor=#E9E9E9
| 603832 ||  || — || October 6, 2008 || Mount Lemmon || Mount Lemmon Survey ||  || align=right data-sort-value="0.73" | 730 m || 
|-id=833 bgcolor=#d6d6d6
| 603833 ||  || — || March 21, 2009 || Mount Lemmon || Mount Lemmon Survey ||  || align=right | 3.0 km || 
|-id=834 bgcolor=#E9E9E9
| 603834 ||  || — || April 13, 2011 || Kitt Peak || Spacewatch ||  || align=right data-sort-value="0.85" | 850 m || 
|-id=835 bgcolor=#C2FFFF
| 603835 ||  || — || April 14, 2015 || Mount Lemmon || Mount Lemmon Survey || L4 || align=right | 6.3 km || 
|-id=836 bgcolor=#C2FFFF
| 603836 ||  || — || April 13, 2015 || Haleakala || Pan-STARRS || L4 || align=right | 8.2 km || 
|-id=837 bgcolor=#E9E9E9
| 603837 ||  || — || April 4, 2002 || Palomar || NEAT ||  || align=right | 1.5 km || 
|-id=838 bgcolor=#d6d6d6
| 603838 ||  || — || November 28, 2014 || Haleakala || Pan-STARRS ||  || align=right | 2.6 km || 
|-id=839 bgcolor=#E9E9E9
| 603839 ||  || — || August 21, 2003 || Palomar || NEAT ||  || align=right | 1.7 km || 
|-id=840 bgcolor=#E9E9E9
| 603840 ||  || — || January 13, 2002 || Kitt Peak || Spacewatch ||  || align=right | 1.2 km || 
|-id=841 bgcolor=#fefefe
| 603841 ||  || — || March 22, 2015 || Haleakala || Pan-STARRS || H || align=right data-sort-value="0.67" | 670 m || 
|-id=842 bgcolor=#E9E9E9
| 603842 ||  || — || February 23, 2015 || Haleakala || Pan-STARRS ||  || align=right | 1.1 km || 
|-id=843 bgcolor=#C2FFFF
| 603843 ||  || — || November 2, 2010 || Mount Lemmon || Mount Lemmon Survey || L4 || align=right | 6.5 km || 
|-id=844 bgcolor=#E9E9E9
| 603844 ||  || — || April 6, 2011 || Kitt Peak || Spacewatch ||  || align=right | 1.1 km || 
|-id=845 bgcolor=#fefefe
| 603845 ||  || — || January 9, 2011 || Mount Lemmon || Mount Lemmon Survey ||  || align=right data-sort-value="0.71" | 710 m || 
|-id=846 bgcolor=#E9E9E9
| 603846 ||  || — || April 29, 2011 || Mount Lemmon || Mount Lemmon Survey ||  || align=right data-sort-value="0.74" | 740 m || 
|-id=847 bgcolor=#d6d6d6
| 603847 ||  || — || October 8, 2007 || Mount Lemmon || Mount Lemmon Survey ||  || align=right | 1.9 km || 
|-id=848 bgcolor=#E9E9E9
| 603848 ||  || — || March 18, 2015 || Haleakala || Pan-STARRS ||  || align=right | 1.7 km || 
|-id=849 bgcolor=#E9E9E9
| 603849 ||  || — || November 1, 2013 || Mount Lemmon || Mount Lemmon Survey ||  || align=right data-sort-value="0.75" | 750 m || 
|-id=850 bgcolor=#E9E9E9
| 603850 ||  || — || April 14, 2015 || Mount Lemmon || Mount Lemmon Survey ||  || align=right | 1.0 km || 
|-id=851 bgcolor=#d6d6d6
| 603851 ||  || — || October 11, 2007 || Kitt Peak || Spacewatch ||  || align=right | 2.3 km || 
|-id=852 bgcolor=#E9E9E9
| 603852 ||  || — || March 5, 2006 || Kitt Peak || Spacewatch ||  || align=right data-sort-value="0.94" | 940 m || 
|-id=853 bgcolor=#fefefe
| 603853 ||  || — || March 10, 2011 || Catalina || CSS ||  || align=right data-sort-value="0.59" | 590 m || 
|-id=854 bgcolor=#E9E9E9
| 603854 ||  || — || September 18, 2003 || Kitt Peak || Spacewatch ||  || align=right | 1.2 km || 
|-id=855 bgcolor=#E9E9E9
| 603855 ||  || — || February 4, 2006 || Kitt Peak || Spacewatch ||  || align=right | 1.3 km || 
|-id=856 bgcolor=#fefefe
| 603856 ||  || — || May 13, 2008 || Mount Lemmon || Mount Lemmon Survey ||  || align=right data-sort-value="0.65" | 650 m || 
|-id=857 bgcolor=#E9E9E9
| 603857 ||  || — || March 17, 2015 || Haleakala || Pan-STARRS ||  || align=right | 1.3 km || 
|-id=858 bgcolor=#E9E9E9
| 603858 ||  || — || December 3, 2005 || Mauna Kea || Mauna Kea Obs. ||  || align=right | 1.7 km || 
|-id=859 bgcolor=#fefefe
| 603859 ||  || — || March 18, 2015 || Haleakala || Pan-STARRS ||  || align=right data-sort-value="0.60" | 600 m || 
|-id=860 bgcolor=#E9E9E9
| 603860 ||  || — || November 7, 2012 || Haleakala || Pan-STARRS ||  || align=right | 2.1 km || 
|-id=861 bgcolor=#E9E9E9
| 603861 ||  || — || November 27, 2013 || Haleakala || Pan-STARRS ||  || align=right | 1.6 km || 
|-id=862 bgcolor=#fefefe
| 603862 ||  || — || February 23, 2015 || Haleakala || Pan-STARRS ||  || align=right data-sort-value="0.90" | 900 m || 
|-id=863 bgcolor=#fefefe
| 603863 ||  || — || May 31, 2008 || Kitt Peak || Spacewatch ||  || align=right data-sort-value="0.63" | 630 m || 
|-id=864 bgcolor=#E9E9E9
| 603864 ||  || — || October 20, 2012 || Haleakala || Pan-STARRS ||  || align=right | 2.1 km || 
|-id=865 bgcolor=#FA8072
| 603865 ||  || — || May 11, 2005 || Kitt Peak || Spacewatch || H || align=right data-sort-value="0.57" | 570 m || 
|-id=866 bgcolor=#fefefe
| 603866 ||  || — || October 26, 2005 || Kitt Peak || Spacewatch ||  || align=right data-sort-value="0.73" | 730 m || 
|-id=867 bgcolor=#fefefe
| 603867 ||  || — || July 29, 2005 || Palomar || NEAT ||  || align=right data-sort-value="0.76" | 760 m || 
|-id=868 bgcolor=#C2FFFF
| 603868 ||  || — || September 28, 2009 || Mount Lemmon || Mount Lemmon Survey || L4 || align=right | 7.8 km || 
|-id=869 bgcolor=#E9E9E9
| 603869 ||  || — || November 9, 2013 || Kitt Peak || Spacewatch ||  || align=right | 1.2 km || 
|-id=870 bgcolor=#fefefe
| 603870 ||  || — || January 17, 2007 || Kitt Peak || Spacewatch ||  || align=right data-sort-value="0.70" | 700 m || 
|-id=871 bgcolor=#fefefe
| 603871 ||  || — || October 26, 2013 || Mount Lemmon || Mount Lemmon Survey ||  || align=right data-sort-value="0.83" | 830 m || 
|-id=872 bgcolor=#fefefe
| 603872 ||  || — || December 24, 2013 || Mount Lemmon || Mount Lemmon Survey ||  || align=right data-sort-value="0.91" | 910 m || 
|-id=873 bgcolor=#E9E9E9
| 603873 ||  || — || January 20, 2015 || Haleakala || Pan-STARRS ||  || align=right | 1.3 km || 
|-id=874 bgcolor=#E9E9E9
| 603874 ||  || — || June 5, 2011 || Mount Lemmon || Mount Lemmon Survey ||  || align=right | 2.2 km || 
|-id=875 bgcolor=#d6d6d6
| 603875 ||  || — || September 4, 2011 || Haleakala || Pan-STARRS ||  || align=right | 2.7 km || 
|-id=876 bgcolor=#E9E9E9
| 603876 ||  || — || November 3, 1999 || Kitt Peak || Spacewatch ||  || align=right | 1.3 km || 
|-id=877 bgcolor=#fefefe
| 603877 ||  || — || October 5, 2005 || Catalina || CSS ||  || align=right data-sort-value="0.92" | 920 m || 
|-id=878 bgcolor=#E9E9E9
| 603878 ||  || — || March 21, 2015 || Haleakala || Pan-STARRS ||  || align=right data-sort-value="0.79" | 790 m || 
|-id=879 bgcolor=#d6d6d6
| 603879 ||  || — || November 12, 2007 || Mount Lemmon || Mount Lemmon Survey ||  || align=right | 2.2 km || 
|-id=880 bgcolor=#E9E9E9
| 603880 ||  || — || April 21, 2002 || Kitt Peak || Spacewatch ||  || align=right | 1.2 km || 
|-id=881 bgcolor=#fefefe
| 603881 ||  || — || August 13, 2012 || Haleakala || Pan-STARRS ||  || align=right data-sort-value="0.73" | 730 m || 
|-id=882 bgcolor=#E9E9E9
| 603882 ||  || — || September 13, 2007 || Mount Lemmon || Mount Lemmon Survey ||  || align=right | 1.7 km || 
|-id=883 bgcolor=#d6d6d6
| 603883 ||  || — || February 4, 2009 || Mount Lemmon || Mount Lemmon Survey ||  || align=right | 2.2 km || 
|-id=884 bgcolor=#E9E9E9
| 603884 ||  || — || February 27, 2006 || Kitt Peak || Spacewatch ||  || align=right | 1.2 km || 
|-id=885 bgcolor=#E9E9E9
| 603885 ||  || — || March 17, 2015 || Haleakala || Pan-STARRS ||  || align=right data-sort-value="0.83" | 830 m || 
|-id=886 bgcolor=#fefefe
| 603886 ||  || — || August 25, 2012 || Haleakala || Pan-STARRS ||  || align=right data-sort-value="0.85" | 850 m || 
|-id=887 bgcolor=#E9E9E9
| 603887 ||  || — || November 19, 2008 || Mount Lemmon || Mount Lemmon Survey ||  || align=right data-sort-value="0.83" | 830 m || 
|-id=888 bgcolor=#d6d6d6
| 603888 ||  || — || October 8, 2012 || Mount Lemmon || Mount Lemmon Survey ||  || align=right | 1.7 km || 
|-id=889 bgcolor=#d6d6d6
| 603889 ||  || — || March 18, 2015 || Haleakala || Pan-STARRS ||  || align=right | 1.8 km || 
|-id=890 bgcolor=#fefefe
| 603890 ||  || — || May 31, 2008 || Kitt Peak || Spacewatch ||  || align=right data-sort-value="0.49" | 490 m || 
|-id=891 bgcolor=#E9E9E9
| 603891 ||  || — || May 13, 2011 || Mount Lemmon || Mount Lemmon Survey ||  || align=right data-sort-value="0.76" | 760 m || 
|-id=892 bgcolor=#fefefe
| 603892 ||  || — || January 27, 2007 || Mount Lemmon || Mount Lemmon Survey ||  || align=right data-sort-value="0.63" | 630 m || 
|-id=893 bgcolor=#fefefe
| 603893 ||  || — || April 5, 2008 || Kitt Peak || Spacewatch ||  || align=right data-sort-value="0.52" | 520 m || 
|-id=894 bgcolor=#E9E9E9
| 603894 ||  || — || February 27, 2001 || Kitt Peak || Spacewatch ||  || align=right | 1.6 km || 
|-id=895 bgcolor=#d6d6d6
| 603895 ||  || — || November 14, 2012 || Kitt Peak || Spacewatch ||  || align=right | 2.2 km || 
|-id=896 bgcolor=#E9E9E9
| 603896 ||  || — || April 23, 2015 || Haleakala || Pan-STARRS ||  || align=right data-sort-value="0.57" | 570 m || 
|-id=897 bgcolor=#fefefe
| 603897 ||  || — || April 23, 2015 || Haleakala || Pan-STARRS ||  || align=right data-sort-value="0.61" | 610 m || 
|-id=898 bgcolor=#fefefe
| 603898 ||  || — || February 18, 2008 || Mount Lemmon || Mount Lemmon Survey ||  || align=right data-sort-value="0.53" | 530 m || 
|-id=899 bgcolor=#d6d6d6
| 603899 ||  || — || October 17, 2007 || Mount Lemmon || Mount Lemmon Survey ||  || align=right | 2.1 km || 
|-id=900 bgcolor=#E9E9E9
| 603900 ||  || — || March 24, 2006 || Kitt Peak || Spacewatch ||  || align=right | 1.5 km || 
|}

603901–604000 

|-bgcolor=#E9E9E9
| 603901 ||  || — || October 15, 2012 || Haleakala || Pan-STARRS ||  || align=right | 1.9 km || 
|-id=902 bgcolor=#E9E9E9
| 603902 ||  || — || May 26, 2011 || Kitt Peak || Spacewatch ||  || align=right data-sort-value="0.61" | 610 m || 
|-id=903 bgcolor=#E9E9E9
| 603903 ||  || — || May 21, 2011 || Mount Lemmon || Mount Lemmon Survey ||  || align=right data-sort-value="0.89" | 890 m || 
|-id=904 bgcolor=#E9E9E9
| 603904 ||  || — || April 11, 2015 || Kitt Peak || Spacewatch ||  || align=right data-sort-value="0.75" | 750 m || 
|-id=905 bgcolor=#E9E9E9
| 603905 ||  || — || October 9, 2012 || Haleakala || Pan-STARRS ||  || align=right | 1.2 km || 
|-id=906 bgcolor=#E9E9E9
| 603906 ||  || — || November 10, 2009 || Kitt Peak || Spacewatch ||  || align=right data-sort-value="0.72" | 720 m || 
|-id=907 bgcolor=#E9E9E9
| 603907 ||  || — || May 25, 2011 || Nogales || M. Schwartz, P. R. Holvorcem ||  || align=right data-sort-value="0.72" | 720 m || 
|-id=908 bgcolor=#E9E9E9
| 603908 ||  || — || November 9, 2004 || Mauna Kea || Mauna Kea Obs. ||  || align=right data-sort-value="0.79" | 790 m || 
|-id=909 bgcolor=#d6d6d6
| 603909 ||  || — || September 18, 2001 || Kitt Peak || Spacewatch || 3:2 || align=right | 3.2 km || 
|-id=910 bgcolor=#E9E9E9
| 603910 ||  || — || October 11, 2007 || Mount Lemmon || Mount Lemmon Survey ||  || align=right | 1.7 km || 
|-id=911 bgcolor=#E9E9E9
| 603911 ||  || — || April 17, 2015 || Mount Lemmon || Mount Lemmon Survey ||  || align=right data-sort-value="0.92" | 920 m || 
|-id=912 bgcolor=#fefefe
| 603912 ||  || — || April 23, 2015 || Haleakala || Pan-STARRS ||  || align=right data-sort-value="0.60" | 600 m || 
|-id=913 bgcolor=#fefefe
| 603913 ||  || — || January 28, 2015 || Haleakala || Pan-STARRS || H || align=right data-sort-value="0.67" | 670 m || 
|-id=914 bgcolor=#E9E9E9
| 603914 ||  || — || January 5, 2006 || Mount Lemmon || Mount Lemmon Survey ||  || align=right data-sort-value="0.97" | 970 m || 
|-id=915 bgcolor=#d6d6d6
| 603915 ||  || — || April 13, 2015 || Haleakala || Pan-STARRS ||  || align=right | 2.5 km || 
|-id=916 bgcolor=#E9E9E9
| 603916 ||  || — || May 25, 2011 || Kitt Peak || Spacewatch ||  || align=right | 1.1 km || 
|-id=917 bgcolor=#E9E9E9
| 603917 ||  || — || December 4, 2013 || Haleakala || Pan-STARRS ||  || align=right | 2.0 km || 
|-id=918 bgcolor=#E9E9E9
| 603918 ||  || — || February 23, 2015 || Haleakala || Pan-STARRS ||  || align=right data-sort-value="0.74" | 740 m || 
|-id=919 bgcolor=#E9E9E9
| 603919 ||  || — || November 21, 2009 || Mount Lemmon || Mount Lemmon Survey ||  || align=right | 1.3 km || 
|-id=920 bgcolor=#E9E9E9
| 603920 ||  || — || February 16, 2015 || Haleakala || Pan-STARRS ||  || align=right | 1.0 km || 
|-id=921 bgcolor=#E9E9E9
| 603921 ||  || — || February 16, 2015 || Haleakala || Pan-STARRS || EUN || align=right | 1.0 km || 
|-id=922 bgcolor=#E9E9E9
| 603922 ||  || — || December 30, 2013 || Haleakala || Pan-STARRS ||  || align=right | 1.3 km || 
|-id=923 bgcolor=#E9E9E9
| 603923 ||  || — || February 23, 2015 || Haleakala || Pan-STARRS ||  || align=right | 2.1 km || 
|-id=924 bgcolor=#E9E9E9
| 603924 ||  || — || October 17, 2012 || Haleakala || Pan-STARRS ||  || align=right | 1.0 km || 
|-id=925 bgcolor=#C2FFFF
| 603925 ||  || — || October 22, 2009 || Mount Lemmon || Mount Lemmon Survey || L4 || align=right | 7.1 km || 
|-id=926 bgcolor=#d6d6d6
| 603926 ||  || — || October 8, 2012 || Mount Lemmon || Mount Lemmon Survey ||  || align=right | 2.5 km || 
|-id=927 bgcolor=#E9E9E9
| 603927 ||  || — || February 4, 2006 || Mount Lemmon || Mount Lemmon Survey ||  || align=right data-sort-value="0.98" | 980 m || 
|-id=928 bgcolor=#C2FFFF
| 603928 ||  || — || January 4, 2012 || Mount Lemmon || Mount Lemmon Survey || L4 || align=right | 6.0 km || 
|-id=929 bgcolor=#fefefe
| 603929 ||  || — || March 4, 2011 || Mount Lemmon || Mount Lemmon Survey ||  || align=right data-sort-value="0.64" | 640 m || 
|-id=930 bgcolor=#fefefe
| 603930 ||  || — || April 23, 2015 || Haleakala || Pan-STARRS ||  || align=right data-sort-value="0.50" | 500 m || 
|-id=931 bgcolor=#E9E9E9
| 603931 ||  || — || September 5, 2007 || Catalina || CSS ||  || align=right | 1.1 km || 
|-id=932 bgcolor=#E9E9E9
| 603932 ||  || — || October 18, 2012 || Haleakala || Pan-STARRS ||  || align=right | 1.0 km || 
|-id=933 bgcolor=#E9E9E9
| 603933 ||  || — || October 10, 2007 || Mount Lemmon || Mount Lemmon Survey ||  || align=right | 2.0 km || 
|-id=934 bgcolor=#E9E9E9
| 603934 ||  || — || April 23, 2015 || Haleakala || Pan-STARRS ||  || align=right | 1.2 km || 
|-id=935 bgcolor=#fefefe
| 603935 ||  || — || November 1, 2006 || Mount Lemmon || Mount Lemmon Survey ||  || align=right data-sort-value="0.74" | 740 m || 
|-id=936 bgcolor=#E9E9E9
| 603936 ||  || — || December 7, 2005 || Catalina || CSS ||  || align=right data-sort-value="0.71" | 710 m || 
|-id=937 bgcolor=#E9E9E9
| 603937 ||  || — || October 5, 2012 || Mount Lemmon || Mount Lemmon Survey ||  || align=right | 1.4 km || 
|-id=938 bgcolor=#E9E9E9
| 603938 ||  || — || September 18, 2003 || Kitt Peak || Spacewatch ||  || align=right | 1.5 km || 
|-id=939 bgcolor=#E9E9E9
| 603939 ||  || — || October 25, 2008 || Mount Lemmon || Mount Lemmon Survey ||  || align=right | 1.1 km || 
|-id=940 bgcolor=#E9E9E9
| 603940 ||  || — || September 21, 2003 || Kitt Peak || Spacewatch ||  || align=right | 1.3 km || 
|-id=941 bgcolor=#E9E9E9
| 603941 ||  || — || June 2, 2011 || Haleakala || Pan-STARRS ||  || align=right data-sort-value="0.87" | 870 m || 
|-id=942 bgcolor=#E9E9E9
| 603942 ||  || — || October 5, 2013 || Haleakala || Pan-STARRS ||  || align=right data-sort-value="0.73" | 730 m || 
|-id=943 bgcolor=#E9E9E9
| 603943 ||  || — || April 23, 2015 || Haleakala || Pan-STARRS ||  || align=right | 1.1 km || 
|-id=944 bgcolor=#E9E9E9
| 603944 ||  || — || October 4, 2007 || Kitt Peak || Spacewatch ||  || align=right | 2.0 km || 
|-id=945 bgcolor=#E9E9E9
| 603945 ||  || — || May 9, 2007 || Mount Lemmon || Mount Lemmon Survey ||  || align=right data-sort-value="0.67" | 670 m || 
|-id=946 bgcolor=#E9E9E9
| 603946 ||  || — || September 19, 2012 || Charleston || R. Holmes ||  || align=right | 1.5 km || 
|-id=947 bgcolor=#E9E9E9
| 603947 ||  || — || April 23, 2015 || Haleakala || Pan-STARRS ||  || align=right data-sort-value="0.64" | 640 m || 
|-id=948 bgcolor=#E9E9E9
| 603948 ||  || — || September 21, 2012 || Mount Lemmon || Mount Lemmon Survey ||  || align=right | 1.0 km || 
|-id=949 bgcolor=#E9E9E9
| 603949 ||  || — || September 18, 2012 || Mount Lemmon || Mount Lemmon Survey ||  || align=right | 1.2 km || 
|-id=950 bgcolor=#E9E9E9
| 603950 ||  || — || April 23, 2015 || Haleakala || Pan-STARRS ||  || align=right | 1.2 km || 
|-id=951 bgcolor=#E9E9E9
| 603951 ||  || — || October 9, 2012 || Haleakala || Pan-STARRS ||  || align=right | 1.4 km || 
|-id=952 bgcolor=#d6d6d6
| 603952 ||  || — || October 8, 2007 || Mount Lemmon || Mount Lemmon Survey ||  || align=right | 2.2 km || 
|-id=953 bgcolor=#fefefe
| 603953 ||  || — || March 20, 2007 || Kitt Peak || Spacewatch ||  || align=right data-sort-value="0.58" | 580 m || 
|-id=954 bgcolor=#d6d6d6
| 603954 ||  || — || November 7, 2012 || Mount Lemmon || Mount Lemmon Survey ||  || align=right | 1.8 km || 
|-id=955 bgcolor=#E9E9E9
| 603955 ||  || — || November 18, 2008 || Kitt Peak || Spacewatch ||  || align=right | 1.7 km || 
|-id=956 bgcolor=#fefefe
| 603956 ||  || — || September 25, 2005 || Kitt Peak || Spacewatch ||  || align=right data-sort-value="0.73" | 730 m || 
|-id=957 bgcolor=#E9E9E9
| 603957 ||  || — || September 18, 2003 || Kitt Peak || Spacewatch ||  || align=right | 1.1 km || 
|-id=958 bgcolor=#E9E9E9
| 603958 ||  || — || March 2, 2006 || Kitt Peak || Spacewatch ||  || align=right | 1.4 km || 
|-id=959 bgcolor=#fefefe
| 603959 ||  || — || April 16, 2007 || Catalina || CSS || H || align=right data-sort-value="0.60" | 600 m || 
|-id=960 bgcolor=#E9E9E9
| 603960 ||  || — || September 22, 2003 || Kitt Peak || Spacewatch ||  || align=right | 1.1 km || 
|-id=961 bgcolor=#d6d6d6
| 603961 ||  || — || January 23, 2015 || Haleakala || Pan-STARRS ||  || align=right | 2.2 km || 
|-id=962 bgcolor=#fefefe
| 603962 ||  || — || January 26, 2011 || Mount Lemmon || Mount Lemmon Survey ||  || align=right data-sort-value="0.75" | 750 m || 
|-id=963 bgcolor=#fefefe
| 603963 ||  || — || August 31, 2005 || Kitt Peak || Spacewatch ||  || align=right data-sort-value="0.65" | 650 m || 
|-id=964 bgcolor=#E9E9E9
| 603964 ||  || — || April 3, 2002 || Kitt Peak || Spacewatch ||  || align=right | 1.3 km || 
|-id=965 bgcolor=#E9E9E9
| 603965 ||  || — || May 5, 2002 || Palomar || NEAT ||  || align=right | 1.5 km || 
|-id=966 bgcolor=#FA8072
| 603966 ||  || — || March 29, 2015 || Mount Lemmon || Mount Lemmon Survey || H || align=right data-sort-value="0.61" | 610 m || 
|-id=967 bgcolor=#E9E9E9
| 603967 ||  || — || October 10, 2008 || Mount Lemmon || Mount Lemmon Survey ||  || align=right | 1.8 km || 
|-id=968 bgcolor=#d6d6d6
| 603968 ||  || — || April 1, 2015 || Haleakala || Pan-STARRS ||  || align=right | 2.9 km || 
|-id=969 bgcolor=#E9E9E9
| 603969 ||  || — || March 31, 2011 || Mount Lemmon || Mount Lemmon Survey ||  || align=right | 1.8 km || 
|-id=970 bgcolor=#E9E9E9
| 603970 ||  || — || October 23, 2003 || Kitt Peak || Spacewatch ||  || align=right | 1.4 km || 
|-id=971 bgcolor=#fefefe
| 603971 ||  || — || April 1, 2015 || Haleakala || Pan-STARRS ||  || align=right data-sort-value="0.68" | 680 m || 
|-id=972 bgcolor=#fefefe
| 603972 ||  || — || April 22, 2015 || Mount Lemmon || Mount Lemmon Survey || H || align=right data-sort-value="0.56" | 560 m || 
|-id=973 bgcolor=#E9E9E9
| 603973 ||  || — || April 20, 2015 || Haleakala || Pan-STARRS ||  || align=right data-sort-value="0.70" | 700 m || 
|-id=974 bgcolor=#E9E9E9
| 603974 ||  || — || March 25, 2006 || Kitt Peak || Spacewatch ||  || align=right | 1.3 km || 
|-id=975 bgcolor=#E9E9E9
| 603975 ||  || — || April 18, 2015 || Haleakala || Pan-STARRS ||  || align=right data-sort-value="0.95" | 950 m || 
|-id=976 bgcolor=#E9E9E9
| 603976 ||  || — || April 18, 2015 || Kitt Peak || Spacewatch ||  || align=right data-sort-value="0.77" | 770 m || 
|-id=977 bgcolor=#E9E9E9
| 603977 ||  || — || October 31, 2005 || Mauna Kea || Mauna Kea Obs. ||  || align=right | 1.3 km || 
|-id=978 bgcolor=#E9E9E9
| 603978 ||  || — || April 25, 2015 || Haleakala || Pan-STARRS ||  || align=right | 1.3 km || 
|-id=979 bgcolor=#d6d6d6
| 603979 ||  || — || April 25, 2015 || Haleakala || Pan-STARRS ||  || align=right | 2.0 km || 
|-id=980 bgcolor=#E9E9E9
| 603980 ||  || — || April 20, 2015 || Haleakala || Pan-STARRS ||  || align=right data-sort-value="0.85" | 850 m || 
|-id=981 bgcolor=#E9E9E9
| 603981 ||  || — || April 18, 2015 || Kitt Peak || Spacewatch ||  || align=right | 1.3 km || 
|-id=982 bgcolor=#E9E9E9
| 603982 ||  || — || April 23, 2015 || Haleakala || Pan-STARRS ||  || align=right data-sort-value="0.84" | 840 m || 
|-id=983 bgcolor=#E9E9E9
| 603983 ||  || — || April 25, 2015 || Haleakala || Pan-STARRS ||  || align=right data-sort-value="0.79" | 790 m || 
|-id=984 bgcolor=#fefefe
| 603984 ||  || — || April 28, 2015 || Nogales || M. Schwartz, P. R. Holvorcem || H || align=right data-sort-value="0.56" | 560 m || 
|-id=985 bgcolor=#d6d6d6
| 603985 ||  || — || April 25, 2015 || Haleakala || Pan-STARRS ||  || align=right | 2.0 km || 
|-id=986 bgcolor=#d6d6d6
| 603986 ||  || — || April 23, 2015 || Haleakala || Pan-STARRS ||  || align=right | 1.9 km || 
|-id=987 bgcolor=#E9E9E9
| 603987 ||  || — || January 10, 2014 || Mount Lemmon || Mount Lemmon Survey ||  || align=right | 2.4 km || 
|-id=988 bgcolor=#E9E9E9
| 603988 ||  || — || April 20, 2015 || Haleakala || Pan-STARRS ||  || align=right | 1.7 km || 
|-id=989 bgcolor=#E9E9E9
| 603989 ||  || — || October 7, 2005 || Mauna Kea || Mauna Kea Obs. ||  || align=right | 1.3 km || 
|-id=990 bgcolor=#fefefe
| 603990 ||  || — || September 15, 2013 || Haleakala || Pan-STARRS || H || align=right data-sort-value="0.36" | 360 m || 
|-id=991 bgcolor=#fefefe
| 603991 ||  || — || June 23, 2010 || Nogales || M. Schwartz, P. R. Holvorcem || H || align=right data-sort-value="0.76" | 760 m || 
|-id=992 bgcolor=#fefefe
| 603992 ||  || — || September 28, 2003 || Kitt Peak || Spacewatch || H || align=right data-sort-value="0.40" | 400 m || 
|-id=993 bgcolor=#E9E9E9
| 603993 ||  || — || March 13, 2005 || Mount Lemmon || Mount Lemmon Survey ||  || align=right | 1.7 km || 
|-id=994 bgcolor=#E9E9E9
| 603994 ||  || — || May 10, 2015 || Mount Lemmon || Mount Lemmon Survey ||  || align=right data-sort-value="0.91" | 910 m || 
|-id=995 bgcolor=#E9E9E9
| 603995 ||  || — || September 24, 2008 || Kitt Peak || Spacewatch ||  || align=right data-sort-value="0.87" | 870 m || 
|-id=996 bgcolor=#fefefe
| 603996 ||  || — || March 21, 2015 || Haleakala || Pan-STARRS ||  || align=right data-sort-value="0.52" | 520 m || 
|-id=997 bgcolor=#E9E9E9
| 603997 ||  || — || May 12, 2015 || Mount Lemmon || Mount Lemmon Survey ||  || align=right data-sort-value="0.79" | 790 m || 
|-id=998 bgcolor=#E9E9E9
| 603998 ||  || — || January 28, 2015 || Haleakala || Pan-STARRS ||  || align=right | 1.4 km || 
|-id=999 bgcolor=#E9E9E9
| 603999 ||  || — || October 27, 2009 || Mount Lemmon || Mount Lemmon Survey ||  || align=right | 1.3 km || 
|-id=000 bgcolor=#d6d6d6
| 604000 ||  || — || March 21, 2015 || Haleakala || Pan-STARRS || Tj (2.98) || align=right | 3.2 km || 
|}

References

External links 
 Discovery Circumstances: Numbered Minor Planets (600001)–(605000) (IAU Minor Planet Center)

0603